= Navarre =

Autonomous community and province of Spain

Navarre: Navarra (Spanish); Nafarroa (Basque)
- Autonomous community and province
- Chartered Community of Navarre; Comunidad Foral de Navarra (Spanish); Nafarroako Foru Erkidegoa (Basque)
- Flag Coat of arms
- Anthem: Himno de las Cortes / Gorteen Ereserkia "Anthem of the Courts"
- Location of Navarre in Spain
- Interactive map of Navarre
- Coordinates: 42°49′N 1°39′W
- Country: Spain
- Capital: Pamplona

Government
  - Type: Devolved government in a constitutional monarchy
  - President: María Chivite (PSN-PSOE)
  - Legislature: Parliament of Navarre

Area
  - Total: 10,392.16 km^{2} (4,012.44 sq mi)
  - Rank: 11th in Spain
- 2.1% of Spain

Population (2025)
  - Total: 683,854
  - Rank: 15th in Spain
  - Density: 65.8048/km^{2} (170.434/sq mi)
- 1.4% of Spain
- Demonym(s): Navarrese (en); Navarro/a (es); Nafartar (eu)

GDP
  - Total: €26.619 billion (2024)
  - Per capita: €38,974 (2024)
- Time zone: UTC+1 (CET)
  - Summer (DST): UTC+2 (CEST)
- ISO 3166-2: ES-NC (autonomous community), ES-NA (province)
- Official languages: Spanish (Basque is co-official in the Basque-speaking areas)
- Statute of Autonomy: 16 August 1982
- Congress seats: 5 (of 350) deputies
- Senate seats: 5 (of 265) senators
- HDI (2022): 0.928 very high · 3rd
- Website: www.navarra.es/home_en/ (ES) www.navarra.es/eu/hasiera (EUS)

Navarre, (Note: Pronunciation of Navarre: /nəˈvɑːr/ nə-VAR Spanish: Navarra [naˈβara] Basque: Nafarroa [nafaro.a]) officially the Chartered Community of Navarre, (Note: Spanish: Comunidad Foral de Navarra [komuniˈðað foˈɾal de naˈβara]; Basque: Nafarroako Foru Komunitatea [nafaro.ako foɾu komunitate.a].) is a landlocked foral autonomous community and province in northern Spain, bordering the Basque Autonomous Community, La Rioja, and Aragon in Spain and Nouvelle-Aquitaine in France. The capital city is Pamplona (Basque: Iruña). The present-day province makes up the majority of the territory of the medieval Kingdom of Navarre, a long-standing Pyrenean kingdom that occupied lands on both sides of the western Pyrenees, with its northernmost part, Lower Navarre, located in the southwest corner of France. As of 2025, Navarra is the 15th most populous autonomous community in Spain with a population of 683,854, which, with an area of 10,392.16 square kilometres (4,012.44 sq mi), makes a population density of 65.8 inhabitants per km^{2}.

Navarre is in the transition zone between the green Cantabrian Coast and semi-arid interior areas and thus its landscapes vary widely across the region. Being in a transition zone also produces a highly variable climate, with summers that are a mix of cooler spells and heat waves, and winters that are mild for the latitude. Navarre is considered by Basque nationalists to be one of the historic Basque provinces: its Basque features are conspicuous in the north, but virtually absent on the southern fringes. The best-known event in Navarre is the annual festival of San Fermín held in Pamplona in July.

== Etymology ==
The first documented use of a name resembling Navarra, Nafarroa, or Naparroa is a reference to navarros, in Eginhard's early-9th-century chronicle of the feats of the Holy Roman Emperor Charlemagne, describing his intrusion to the Ebro river. Other Royal Frankish Annals feature nabarros. There are two proposed etymologies for the name.

- Basque nabar (declined absolute singular nabarra): 'brownish', 'multicolour' (in contrast to the green mountainous lands north of the original County of Navarre).
- Basque naba (or Spanish nava): 'valley', 'plain' + Basque herri ('people', 'land').

The linguist Joan Coromines considers naba to be linguistically part of a wider Vasconic or Aquitanian language substrate, rather than Basque per se.

The official name in Basque is Nafarroa, but the form Nafarroa Garaia (Upper Navarre) is also often seen, sometimes for irredentist reasons, but mostly to distinguish the province from neighboring Lower Navarre.

== History ==
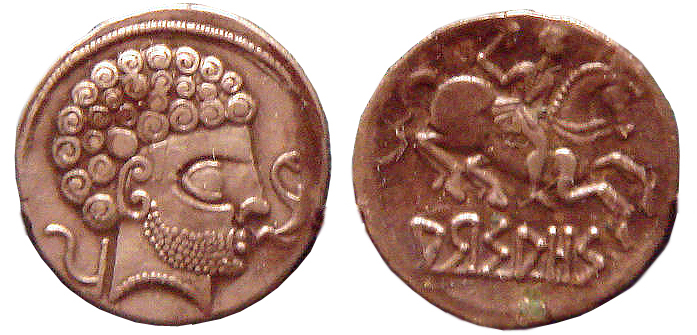
Coins of Arsaos, Navarre, 150 – 100 BC, showing Rome's stylistic influence

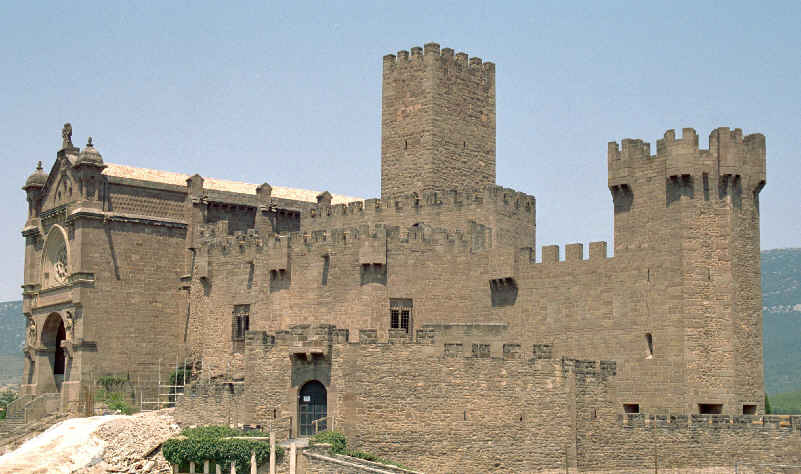
Castle of Xabier

=== Antiquity ===
Before and during the Roman Empire, the Vascones populated the southern slopes of the Pyrenees, including the area which would ultimately become Navarre. In the mountainous north, the Vascones escaped large-scale Roman settlement, except for some coastal areas—for example Oiasso (in what is now Gipuzkoa)—and the flatter areas to the south, Calagurris (in what is now La Rioja), which were amenable to large-scale Roman farming—vineyards, olives, and wheat crops. There is no evidence of battles fought or general hostility between Romans and Basques, as they had the same enemies.

=== Kingdom of Navarre ===
Neither the Visigoths nor the Franks ever completely subjugated the area. The Vascones (to become the Basques) assimilated neighbouring tribes, such as the Suessetani from the area known today as Aragon and the Caristii, Varduli, and Autrigones, likely of Celtic origin, who inhabited the area of today's Basque Country, by the 7th century AD. In the year 778, the Basques defeated a Frankish army at the Battle of Roncevaux Pass.

Following the Battle of Roncevaux Pass (824), the Basque chieftain Iñigo Arista was elected King of Pamplona supported by the muwallad Banu Qasi of Tudela, establishing a Basque kingdom that was later called Navarre. That kingdom reached its zenith during the reign of Sancho III, comprising most of the Christian realms to the south of the Pyrenees, and even a short overlordship of Gascony (in the early 11th century).

When Sancho III died in 1035, the kingdom was divided between his sons. It never fully recovered its political power, while its commercial importance increased as traders and pilgrims (the Francs) poured into the kingdom via the Way of Saint James. In 1200, Navarre lost the key western Basque districts to Alphonse VIII of Castile, leaving the kingdom landlocked. Navarre then contributed with a small but symbolic force of 200 knights to the decisive Battle of Las Navas de Tolosa in 1212 against the Almohads.

The native line of kings came to an end in 1234; their heirs intermarried with French dynasties. However, the Navarrese kept most of their strong laws and institutions. The death of Queen Blanche I (1441) inaugurated a civil war period between the Beaumont and Agramont confederacies with the intervention of the Castilian-Aragonese House of Trastámara in Navarre's internal affairs. In 1512, Navarre was invaded by Ferdinand the Catholic's troops, with Queen Catherine and King John III withdrawing to the north of the Pyrenees, and establishing a Kingdom of Navarre-Béarn, led by Queen Joan III as of 1555.

To the south of the Pyrenees, Navarre was annexed to the Crown of Castile in 1515, but kept a separate ambiguous status, and a shaky balance up to 1610—King Henry IV was ready to march over Spanish Navarre. A Chartered Government was established (the Diputación), and the kingdom managed to keep home rule. Tensions with the Spanish government came to a head as of 1794, when Spanish premier Manuel Godoy attempted to suppress Navarrese and Basque self-government altogether, with the end of the First Carlist War (1839 – 1841) definitely bringing the kingdom and its home rule (fueros) to an end.

=== Province of Spain ===
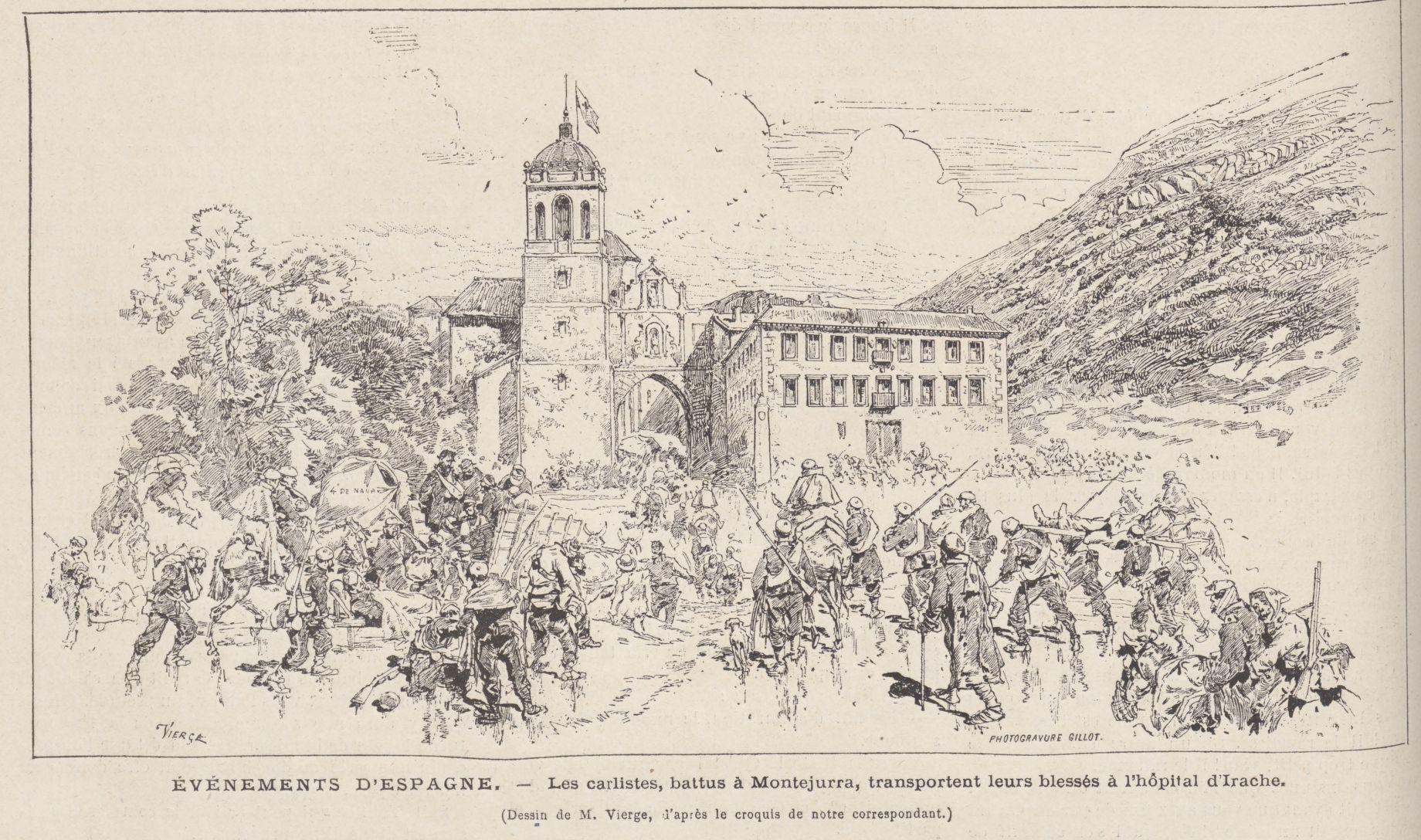
Carlists in retreat to the Monastery of Irache during the Third Carlist War

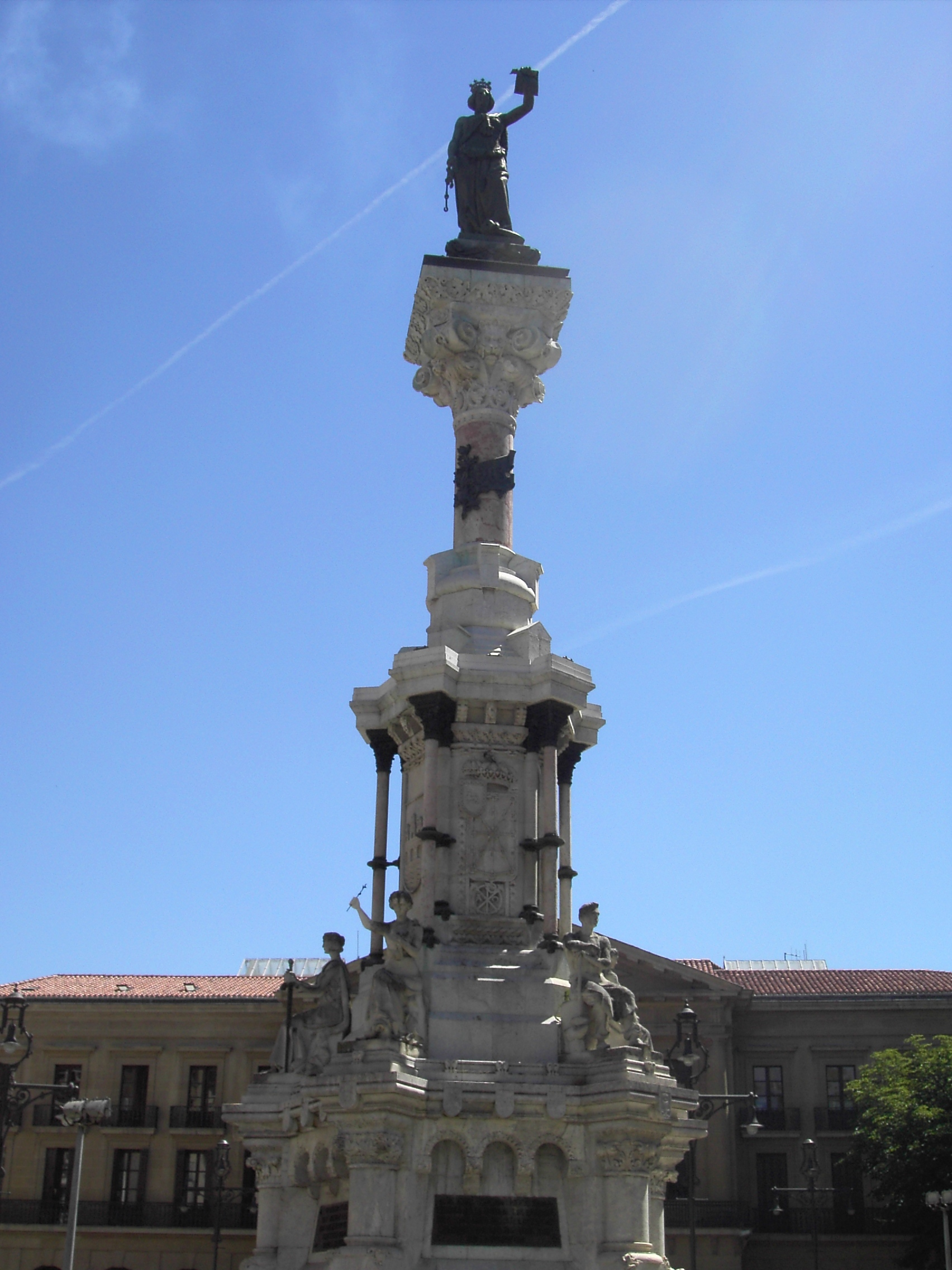
Memorial to the Charters of Navarre erected by popular subscription in Pamplona, after the Gamazada (1903)

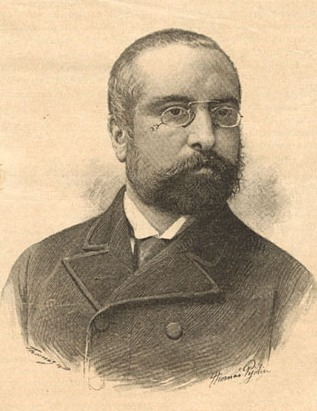
Arturo Campión (1854 – 1937), a major Basque Navarrese activist, and MP in Madrid during the Gamazada

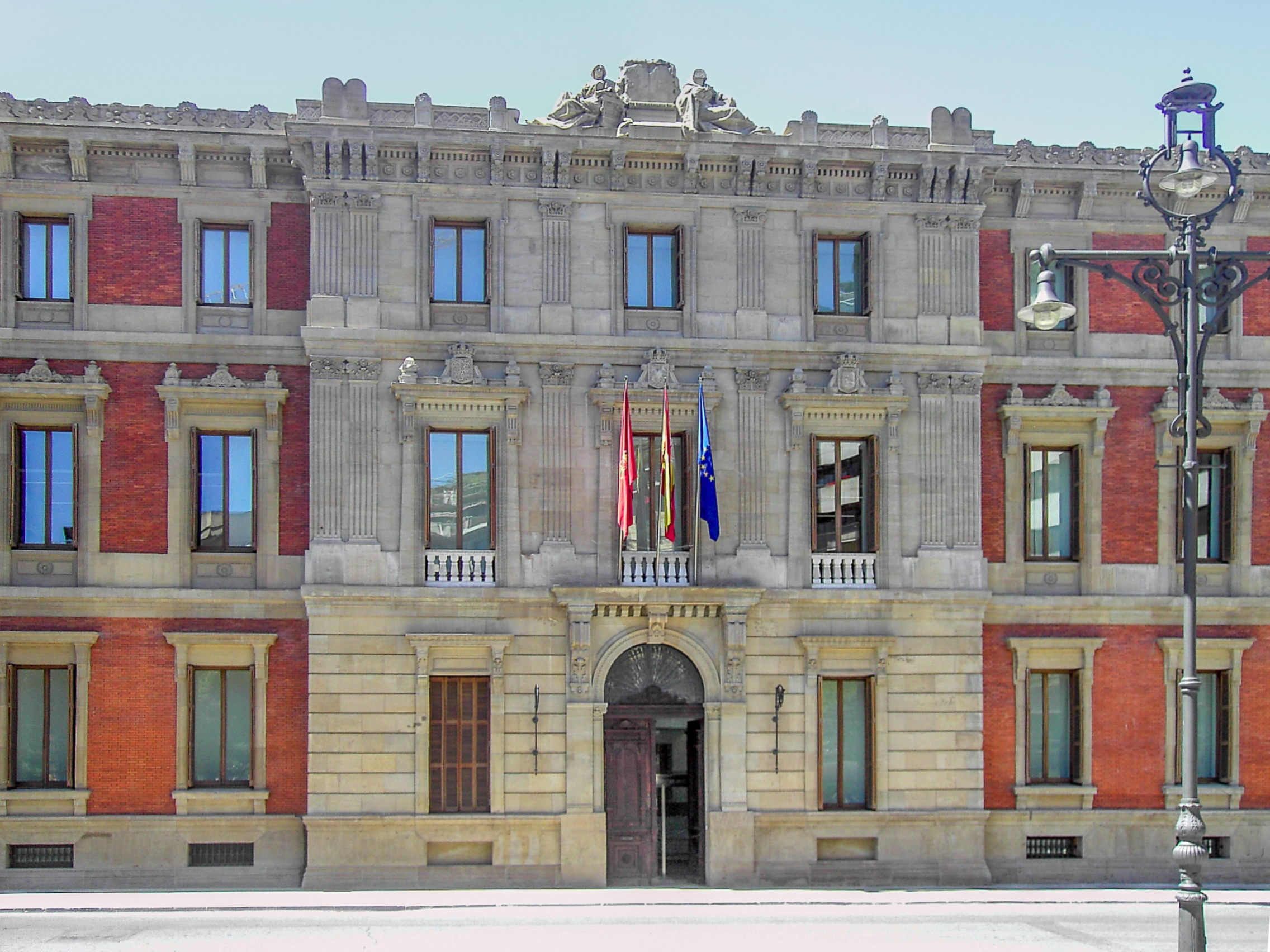
Façade of the Parliament of Navarre in Pamplona

==== Loss of home rule ====
After the 1839 Convention of Bergara, a reduced version of home rule (fueros) was passed in 1839. However, the 1841 Act for the Modification of Fueros (later called the "Compromise Act", Ley Paccionada) definitely made the kingdom into a province after a compromise was reached by the Spanish government with officials of the Provincial Council of Navarre. The relocation of customs from the Ebro river to the Pyrenees in 1841 prompted the collapse of Navarre's customary cross-Pyrenean trade and the rise of smuggling.

Amid instability in Spain, Carlists took over in Navarre and the rest of the Basque provinces. An actual Basque state was established during the Third Carlist War with Estella as its capital (1872 – 1876), but King Alfonso XII's restoration in the throne of Spain and a counter-attack prompted the Carlist defeat. The end of the Third Carlist War saw a renewed wave of Spanish centralisation directly affecting Navarre.

In 1893 – 1894, the Gamazada popular uprising took place centred in Pamplona against Madrid's governmental decisions breaching the 1841 chartered provisions. Except for a small faction (the so-called Alfonsinos), all parties in Navarre agreed on the need for a new political framework based on home rule within the Laurak Bat, the Basque districts in Spain. Among these, the Carlists stood out, who politically dominated the province, and resented an increased string of rulings and laws passed by Madrid, as well as left leaning influences. Unlike Biscay or Gipuzkoa, Navarre did not develop manufacturing during this period, remaining a basically rural economy.

==== Republic and military uprising ====
In 1932, a Basque Country's separate statute failed to take off over disagreements on the centrality of Catholicism, a scene of political radicalisation ensued dividing the leftist and rightist forces during the 2nd Spanish Republic (1931 – 1939). Thousands of landless labourers occupied properties of wealthy landowners in October 1933, leaving the latter eager for revenge. The most reactionary and clerical Carlists came to prominence, ideologues such as Víctor Pradera, and an understanding with General Mola paved the way to the Spanish Nationalist uprising in Pamplona (18 July 1936).

The triumphant military revolt was followed by a terror campaign in the rearguard against blacklisted individuals considered to be progressive ("reds"), mildly republican, or just inconvenient. The purge especially affected southern Navarre along the Ebro banks, and counted on the active complicity of the clergy, who adopted the fascist salute and even involved in murderous tasks. The killing took a death toll of at least 2,857, plus a further 305 dying in prisons (ill-treatment, malnutrition).

The dead were buried in mass graves or discarded into chasms abounding on the central hilly areas (Urbasa, etc.). Basque nationalists were also chased to a lesser extent, e.g. Fortunato Aguirre, a Basque nationalist and mayor of Estella (and co-founder of Osasuna Football Club), was executed in September 1936. Humiliation and silence ensued for the survivors. Pamplona became the rebel launching point against the Republic during the War in the North.

==== Post-war scene ====
As a reward for its support in the Spanish Civil War (Navarre sided for the most part with the military uprising), Franco allowed Navarre, as it happened with Álava, to maintain during his dictatorship a number of prerogatives reminiscent of the ancient Navarrese liberties. The bleak post-war years were shaken by shortage, famine, and smuggling, with the economy relying on agriculture (wheat, vineyards, olive, barley), and a negative migration balance. The victors came to cluster around two main factions, Carlists and Falangists, while the totalitarian ultra-Catholic environment provided fertile grounds for another religious group, the Opus Dei, to found their University of Navarre (1952), ever more influential in Pamplona.

The coming of the society of consumption and incipient economic liberalisation saw also the establishment of factories and workshops during the early 1960s (automobile manufacturing and accessories, etc.), especially around the overgrown capital. It was followed by labour and political unrest.

==== Tension during the Spanish transition ====
Officials and figures with good connections to the Navarrese regional government went on to join Adolfo Suárez's UCD, later splitting into the party UPN led by Jesús Aizpún Tuero (1979), refusing to join a democratic constitutional process on the grounds that Navarre's charters (or fueros) remained in place. They also refused to join the Basque process to become an autonomous community, where recently legalised Basque nationalist and leftist parties held a majority.

A continuation of the institutional framework inherited from the dictatorship and its accommodation into the Spanish democracy was guaranteed by the Betterment ("Amejoramiento"), a Navarre-only solution considered 'an upgrade' of its former status issued from the (remains of the) charters. In a three-year span, the Spanish Socialists in Navarre veered in their position, quit the Basque process, and joined the arrangement adopted for Navarre (Chartered Community of Navarre, 1982). The reform was not ratified by referendum, as demanded by Basque nationalist and minority leftist forces.

== Geography ==
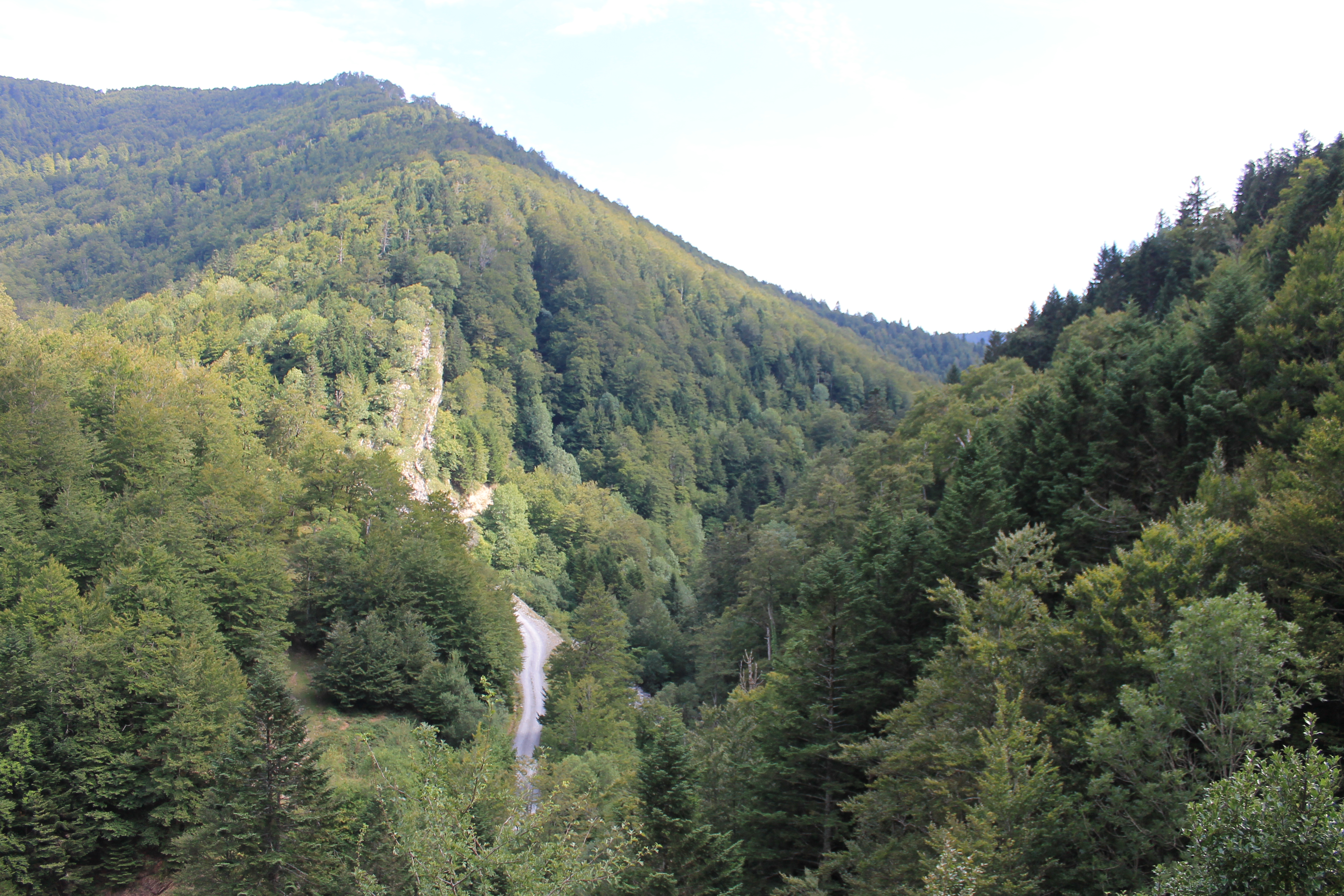
Irati Forest

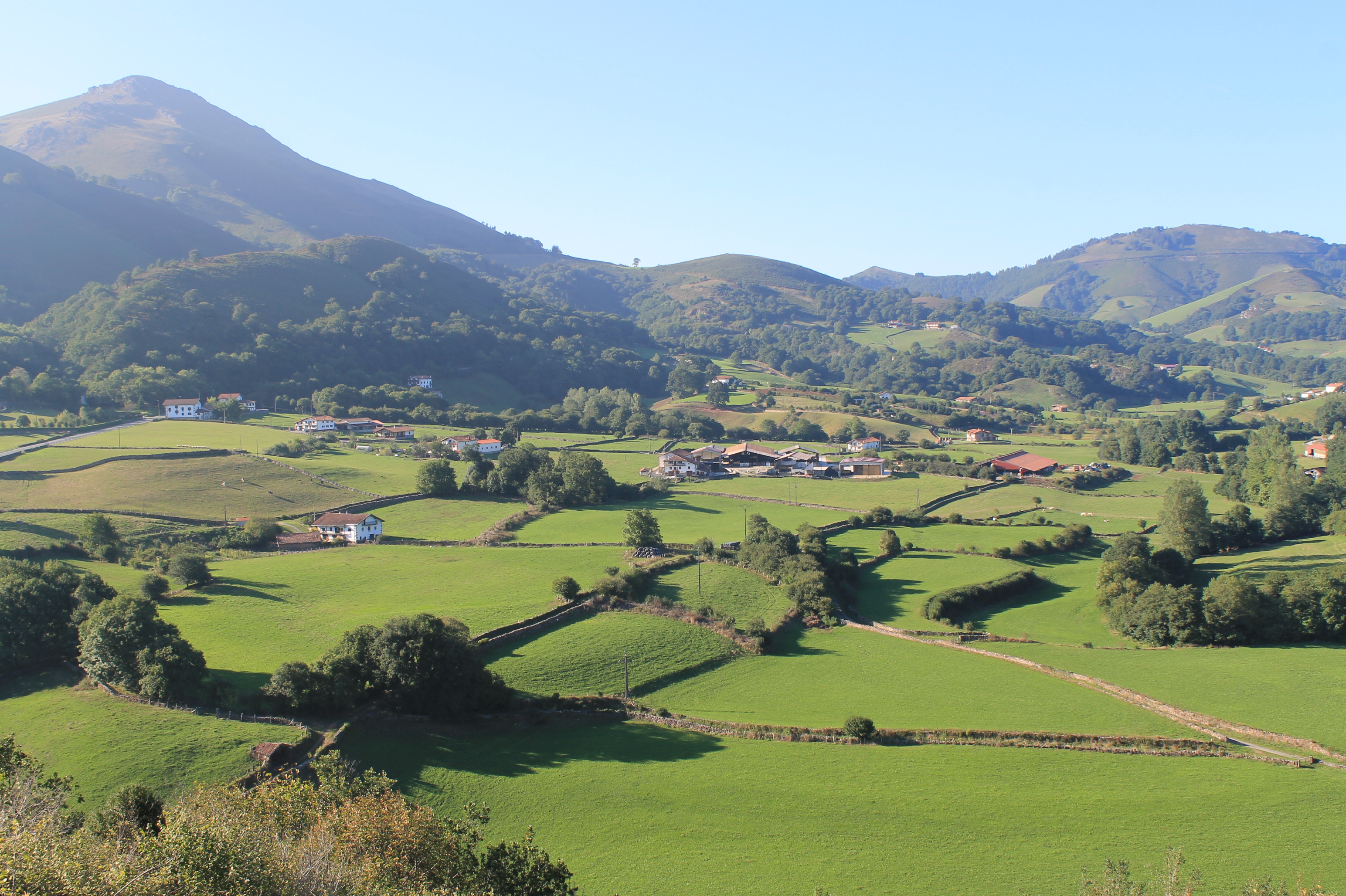
Baztan valley

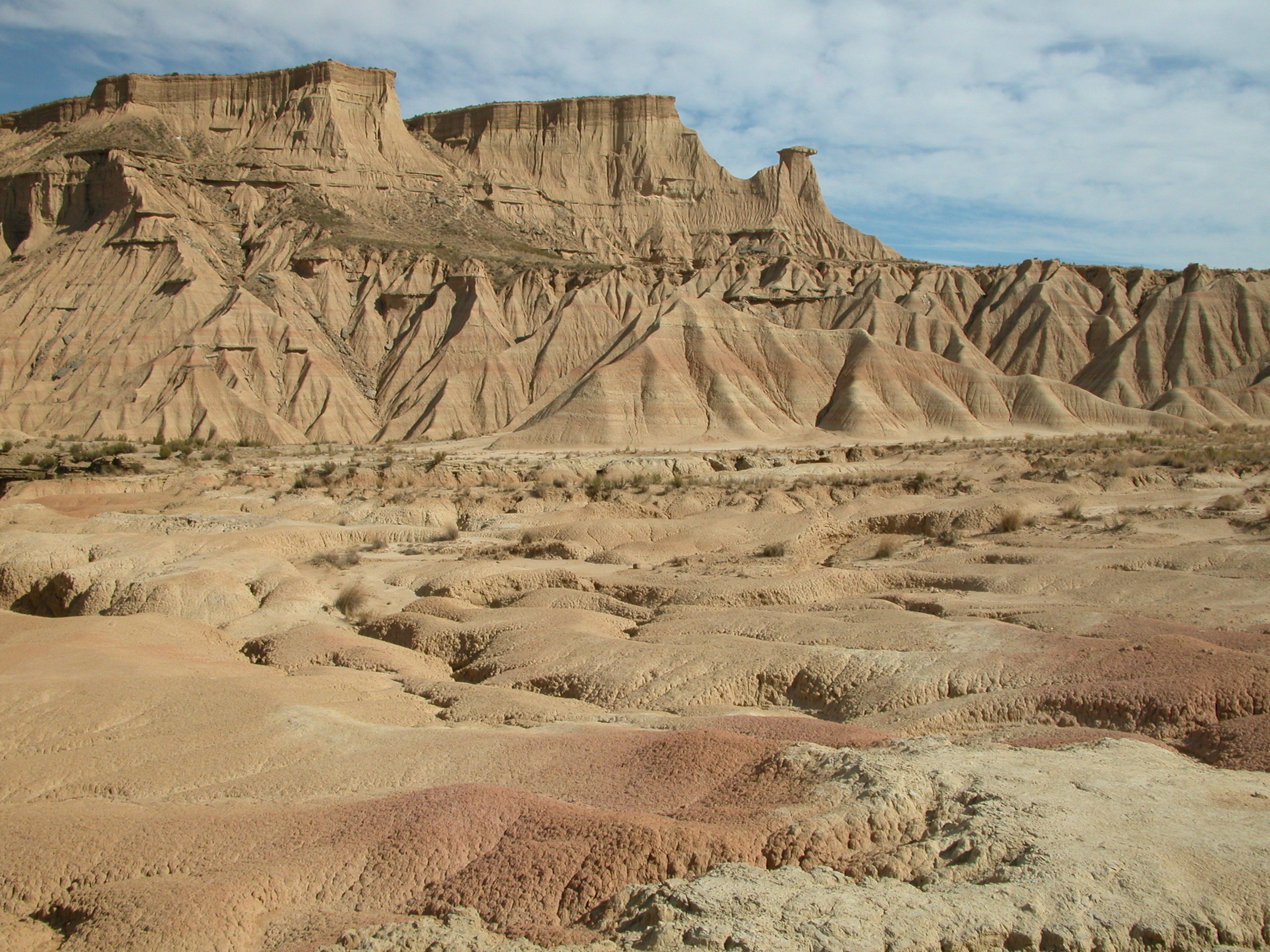
Bardenas Reales

Navarre consists of 272 municipalities and has a total population of 601,874 (2006), of whom approximately one-third live in the capital, Pamplona (195,769 pop.), and one-half in the capital's metropolitan area (315,988 pop.). There are no other large municipalities in the region. The next largest are Tudela (32,802), Barañain (22,401), Burlada/Burlata (18,388), Estella-Lizarra (13,892), Zizur Mayor (13,197), Tafalla (11,040), Villava/Atarrabia (10,295), and Ansoáin/Antsoain (9,952).

Despite its relatively small size, Navarre features stark contrasts in geography, from the Pyrenees mountain range that dominates the territory to the plains of the Ebro river valley in the south. The highest point in Navarre is Mesa de los Tres Reyes, with an elevation of 2,428 metres (7,966 feet).

Other important mountains are Txamantxoia, Kartxela, the Larra-Belagua Massif, Sierra de Alaiz, Untzueko Harria, Sierra de Leyre, Sierra del Perdón, Montejurra, Ezkaba, Monte Ori, Sierra de Codés, Urbasa, Andia, and the Aralar Range.

=== Climate ===
In the north, climate is affected by the Atlantic Ocean leading an Oceanic west coast climate (Köppen: Cfb). Since the northernmost part of Navarre is less than 10 kilometres (6.2 mi) from the Bay of Biscay, the northern fringes resemble San Sebastián. At central Navarre the summer precipitations start to lower, leading to a Mediterranean climate (Köppen: Csa and Csb) At the southernmost part of Navarre the climate is cool semi-arid (Köppen: Bsk). This is also at a comparatively low elevation compared to most of the north, further pontentiating the hot summers in comparison to Pamplona and even more so the northern hilly and mountainous region.

The sole official weather station of Navarre is located in Pamplona in its north-western corner and has summer highs of 28 °C (82 °F) and lows of 14 °C (57 °F), while winter highs are 9 °C (48 °F) and lows 1 °C (34 °F) with moderate precipitation year-round.

Climate data for Pamplona-Iruña
| Month | Jan | Feb | Mar | Apr | May | Jun | Jul | Aug | Sep | Oct | Nov | Dec | Year |
|---|---|---|---|---|---|---|---|---|---|---|---|---|---|
| Record high °C (°F) | 19.5 (67.1) | 23.6 (74.5) | 30 (86) | 29.6 (85.3) | 33.5 (92.3) | 38.5 (101.3) | 40.2 (104.4) | 40.6 (105.1) | 38.8 (101.8) | 30 (86) | 27 (81) | 20 (68) | 40.6 (105.1) |
| Mean daily maximum °C (°F) | 9.1 (48.4) | 10.9 (51.6) | 14.6 (58.3) | 16.4 (61.5) | 20.2 (68.4) | 25.2 (77.4) | 28.2 (82.8) | 28.3 (82.9) | 24.5 (76.1) | 19.3 (66.7) | 13.1 (55.6) | 9.7 (49.5) | 18.4 (65.1) |
| Daily mean °C (°F) | 5.2 (41.4) | 6.3 (43.3) | 9.1 (48.4) | 10.9 (51.6) | 14.7 (58.5) | 18.6 (65.5) | 21.2 (70.2) | 21.4 (70.5) | 18.2 (64.8) | 14.1 (57.4) | 9.0 (48.2) | 6.0 (42.8) | 12.9 (55.2) |
| Mean daily minimum °C (°F) | 1.4 (34.5) | 1.6 (34.9) | 3.7 (38.7) | 5.3 (41.5) | 8.6 (47.5) | 11.9 (53.4) | 14.2 (57.6) | 14.5 (58.1) | 12.0 (53.6) | 8.9 (48.0) | 4.8 (40.6) | 2.2 (36.0) | 7.4 (45.3) |
| Record low °C (°F) | −12.4 (9.7) | −15.2 (4.6) | −9 (16) | −2.2 (28.0) | −0.2 (31.6) | 3.8 (38.8) | 7 (45) | 4.8 (40.6) | 3.4 (38.1) | −1 (30) | −6.6 (20.1) | −14.2 (6.4) | −15.2 (4.6) |
| Average precipitation mm (inches) | 57 (2.2) | 50 (2.0) | 54 (2.1) | 74 (2.9) | 60 (2.4) | 46 (1.8) | 33 (1.3) | 38 (1.5) | 44 (1.7) | 68 (2.7) | 75 (3.0) | 72 (2.8) | 674 (26.5) |
| Average relative humidity (%) | 78 | 72 | 66 | 65 | 63 | 59 | 57 | 58 | 62 | 69 | 76 | 78 | 67 |
| Mean monthly sunshine hours | 93 | 125 | 177 | 185 | 228 | 268 | 310 | 282 | 219 | 164 | 108 | 88 | 2,240 |
Source 1:
Source 2:

== Demographics ==
Historical population
| Year | Pop. | ±% |
|---|---|---|
| 1842 | 235,874 | — |
| 1857 | 297,422 | +26.1% |
| 1877 | 316,899 | +6.5% |
| 1887 | 307,994 | −2.8% |
| 1900 | 310,355 | +0.8% |
| 1910 | 323,503 | +4.2% |
| 1920 | 339,220 | +4.9% |
| 1930 | 352,108 | +3.8% |
| 1940 | 365,014 | +3.7% |
| 1950 | 383,354 | +5.0% |
| 1960 | 406,838 | +6.1% |
| 1970 | 466,593 | +14.7% |
| 1981 | 509,002 | +9.1% |
| 1991 | 519,277 | +2.0% |
| 2001 | 555,829 | +7.0% |
| 2011 | 640,129 | +15.2% |
| 2021 | 662,032 | +3.4% |
Source: INE

As of 2025, the population is 683,854, of which 49.5% are males, and 50.5% are females. Minors make up 17.4% of the population, and seniors make up 21.0%.

=== Languages ===
The Iberian Peninsula in 1030. The first evidence of written Romance in central Spain and of written Basque is in the Glosas Emilianenses, from La Rioja, a territory that was part of Navarre for some time. The map shows the Kingdom of Pamplona through the years 1029-1035.

Presently, Spanish is predominantly spoken in most of the autonomous community, except for north-western areas, where Basque continues to be the prevailing language. According to official statistics, Spanish is the mother tongue of 81.9% of the population, Basque is 5.7% of the population's mother tongue, and 3.8% of the population has both languages as their mother tongue while 6.1% of the population have another language as their mother tongue.

==== Language shift ====
The number of people that can speak Basque has increased in Navarre lately, after a steady historic retreat. In 2011, 13.6% of the population in Navarre considered themselves to be speakers of Basque and another 14.5% considered themselves semi-speakers of Basque. Historically, Basque is the lingua navarrorum, as it appears in documents of the Middle Ages, such as a document by the king Sancho the Wise. The kingdom cemented its roots in the predominantly Basque-speaking domain of Pamplona and surrounding areas. In the midst of contemporary scholarly debates on the existence of Navarre and its laws prior to the king's authority, the Navarrese author Garcia de Gongora states as follows in 1626:

Two languages are spoken across the kingdom, Basque and Romance, but most properly the Cantabric [language] Basque, the original and most ancient, brought along by its creator, the patriarch Tubal, devoid of mingling with others; it has always been preserved there, except in the Ribera and the bordering areas of Castile and Aragon, where Romance is spoken.

— García de Gongora (pseudonym of Juan Sada Amezqueta)

José Moret, chronicler of the kingdom, called Navarre and its bordering provinces "the lands of Basque", claiming also that Tubal founded the Kingdom of Navarre. However, Basque underwent a gradual erosion, accelerated following the conquest of the kingdom in the early 16th century due to the homogenizing push of the new Castilian authorities and the neglect of its own elites, among other reasons. By 1778, 121,000 inhabitants out of 227,000 were Basque speakers, 53% of its population, still the largest amount of Basque speakers across all Basque territories. However, the number of speakers dropped sharply in the 19th century. In 1936, Basque speakers accounted for a 17% of the total Navarrese population.

Other languages have been spoken, but have disappeared, such as Navarrese Romance, a Romance language that was spoken in the Middle Ages around the central part of the Ebro basin. Starting in the late 11th century, the influx of pilgrims and colonizers from Toulouse and surrounding areas (Francs) who settled in separate boroughs along the Way of Saint James rendered Occitan the status language of the kingdom up to early 14th century. Navarro-Aragonese became the written language in court and royal administration by 1329, when it reached official status. However, from the 15th century onwards the language grew closer to Castilian (Spanish) and eventually merged with it. Other languages which at some point held a status or were spoken in certain communities and periods are Erromintxela, French, Hebrew, and Arabic.

==== Linguistic division of the territory and legal consequences ====
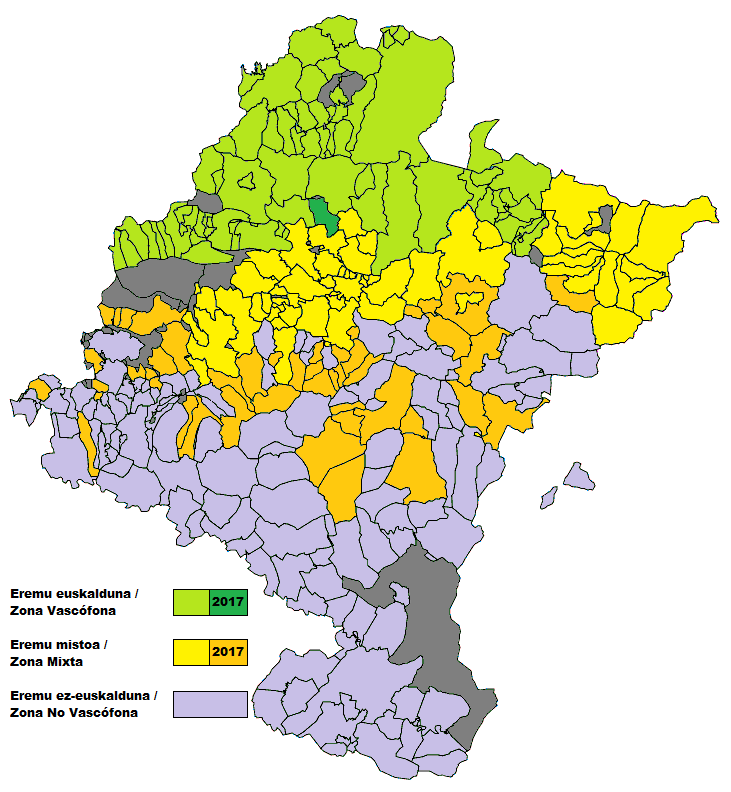
Distribution by municipality of the Basque-speaking zone, mixed-speaking zone and the non-Basque speaking zone through the modification of 2017.

Percentage of people that speak Basque well (2001).

According to the 1978 Spanish constitution and the Amejoramiento del Fuero, a Navarrese law establishing the basic institutional make-up of the chartered community of Navarre, Spanish is the official language of Navarre, while the Basque language is also the official language in Basque-Speaking areas. Unlike any other statutes in the Spanish autonomous communities owning a regional language, the Amejoramiento omits citing Basque as a specific language of its people or its consideration as part of the Navarrese heritage.

The Statutory Law of Basque of 1986 defined the above areas, creating the Basque-speaking zone, an area in northern Navarre in which Basque is the co-official language along with Spanish. This law recognizes Spanish and Basque as Navarre's lenguas propias (i.e. 'native languages'), according to the Foral Law 18/1986 of Basque. This law divides Navarre into three linguistically distinct areas, a Basque-speaking zone, where Basque is the dominant language, a Mixed-speaking zone, where Basque and Spanish are both dominant, and a Non-Basque speaking zone, where Spanish is the dominant language. In the latter, the public entities of Navarre are required to use only Spanish, but in the mixed area the use of Basque is also confined to certain position. The area of the municipalities belonging to the Basque-speaking and Mixed Basque and Spanish-speaking zones are the following:

- Basque-speaking zone: Abaurrea Alta, Abaurrea Baja, Alsasua, Anué, Araiz, Aranaz, Arano, Araquil, Arbizu, Areso, Aria, Arive, Arruazu, Bacáicoa, Basaburúa Mayor, Baztán, Beinza-Labayen, Bertiz-Arana, Betelu, Burguete – Auritz, Ciordia, Donamaría, Echalar, Echarri Aranaz, Elgorriaga, Erasun, Ergoyena, Erro, Esteríbar, Ezcurra, Garayoa, Garralda, Goizueta, Huarte-Araquil, Imoz, Irañeta, Ituren, Iturmendi, Lacunza, Lantz, Larráun, Leiza, Lesaca, Oiz, Olazagutía, Orbaiceta, Orbara, Roncesvalles, Saldías, Santesteban, Sumbilla, Ulzama, Urdax, Urdiáin, Urroz de Santesteban, Valcarlos, Vera de Bidasoa, Villanueva de Aézcoa, Yanci, Zubieta and Zugarramurdi.

Later, two more municipalities would be added that came from the Basque-speaking zone: Lecumberri and Irurzun.

- Mixed-speaking zone: Abárzuza, Ansoáin, Aoiz, Arce, Atez, Barañáin, Burgui, Burlada, Ciriza, Cendea de Cizur, Echarri, Echauri, Valle de Egüés, Ezcároz, Esparza de Salazar, Estella, Ezcabarte, Garde, Goñi, Güesa, Guesálaz, Huarte, Isaba, Iza, Izalzu, Jaurrieta, Juslapeña, Lezáu, Lizoáin, Ochagavía, Odieta, Oláibar, Olza, Ollo, Oronz, Oroz-Betelu, Pamplona, Puente la Reina, Roncal, Salinas de Oro, Sarriés, Urzainqui, Uztárroz, Vidángoz, Vidaurreta, Villava, Yerri, Zabalza and Zizur Mayor.

As a consequence of the constitution of new municipalities, other municipalities would be added: Berrioplano, Berriozar, Orcoyen and Zizur Mayor. Moreover, in 2010 a legal modification granted four municipalities of Cuenca de Pamplona the power of incorporating into the Mixed-speaking zone if the absolute majority decided to be incorporated into the Mixed-speaking zone. Aranguren, Belascoáin and Galar decided to be incorporated into the Mixed-speaking zone while Noáin decided to remain in the Basque-speaking zone.

One modification to the law implemented in June 2017 allowed 44 municipalities from the Non-Basque speaking zone to become a part of the mixed zone (Abáigar, Adiós, Aibar, Allín, Améscoa Baja, Ancín, Añorbe, Aranarache, Arellano, Artazu, Bargota, Beriáin, Biurrun-Olcoz, Cabredo, Dicastillo, Enériz, Eulate, Gallués, Garínoain, Izagaondoa, Larraona, Leoz, Lerga, Lónguida, Mendigorría, Metauten, Mirafuentes, Murieta, Nazar, Obanos, Olite, Oteiza, Pueyo, Sangüesa, Tafalla, Tiebas, Tirapu, Unzué, Ujué, Urraúl Bajo, Urroz-Villa, Villatuerta, Cirauqui and Zúñiga) and for Atez to pass from the Mixed-speaking zone to the Basque-speaking zone.

- Non-Basque-speaking zone: This zone is composed of the remaining municipalities that are located predominantly towards the Southeast of the foral community where the Basque language is not commonly spoken by the population. However, more people have been speaking Basque in these communities and in present day, there are municipalities in which 10% of their inhabitants are bilingual or semi-bilingual in Basque and Spanish such as in Tafalla, Sangüesa and Lumbier. In comparison, in Tafalla or Sanguesa's population those that speak or understand Basque well are 5% of the population or 10% en Lumbier. In other localities with ikastolas such as in Fontellas, Lodosa and Viana the bilingual population is around 2% and 8%, while those that speak or understand Basque well are 1% in Fontellas, 2% in Lodosa and 5% in Viana. Since 2006-2007 the schools that teach Basque in the Non-Basque speaking zone are assisted by the Department of Education of the government of Navarre.

==== Basque dialects in Navarre ====
Basque in Navarre has various dialects (there are nine according to the classification of the General Basque Dictionary or the Royal Academy of the Basque Language). According to the most recent classification of Koldo Zuazo, the most widespread dialect is Upper Navarrese, spoken in the northern part of Navarre. In localities such as Basaburua Mayor, Imoz and other localities bordering Gipuzkoa, the dialect of Central Basque is spoken and in the central part of the Pyrenees in Navarre a variety of Navarro-Lapurdian is spoken.

On the east of the Pyrenees in Navarre, the Roncalese and Salazarese dialects of Basque used to be spoken in the valleys of Roncal and Salazar, but they disappeared near the end of the twentieth century; the last person who spoke the Roncalese dialect died in 1991 and in Salazar the language also disappeared because the last person who spoke it fluently died during the first years of the twenty-first century. Apart from dialects, sub-dialects from Basque also exist and there are also differences in vocabulary in local linguistic communities.

==== Linguistic traits of the Spanish spoken in Navarre ====
There are a number of features of Spanish as spoken in Navarre that are either exclusive to the area or shared only with neighbouring areas (mainly Aragón and La Rioja), such as the predominance of the diminutive with -ico or the use of the conditional verb tense in place of the preterite of the subjunctive (for example, using podría instead of pudiera). There are also differences in the vocabulary of Spanish speakers from Navarre, including the presence of words of Basque origin, which is in some cases due to a Basque substrate, or long-standing contact and commercial exchanges with areas of Navarre in which Basque is spoken.

=== Largest cities ===
Largest municipalities in Navarre INE – 2025
| Rank | Name | Pop. | Rank | Name | Pop. |
|---|---|---|---|---|---|
| 1 | Pamplona | 209,676 | 11 | Ansoáin – Antsoain | 10,656 |
| 2 | Tudela | 38,773 | 12 | Villava – Atarrabia | 9,918 |
| 3 | Valle de Egüés | 22,785 | 13 | Corella | 8,734 |
| 4 | Burlada | 21,229 | 14 | Cintruénigo | 8,554 |
| 5 | Barañain | 19,588 | 15 | Noain | 8,447 |
| 6 | Zizur Mayor/Zizur Nagusia | 16,466 | 16 | Huarte | 7,900 |
| 7 | Estella-Lizarra | 14,356 | 17 | Baztan | 7,837 |
| 8 | Aranguren | 13,200 | 18 | Alsasua – Altsasu | 7,705 |
| 9 | Berriozar | 11,317 | 19 | Berrioplano–Berriobeiti | 7,624 |
| 10 | Tafalla | 10,867 | 20 | San Adrián | 6,500 |

=== Immigration ===
Foreign population by country of birth (2025)
| Country of birth | Population |
|---|---|
| Morocco | 22,440 |
| Colombia | 17,345 |
| Ecuador | 16,654 |
| Peru | 7,858 |
| Romania | 6,183 |
| Bulgaria | 4,917 |
| Venezuela | 4,614 |
| Bolivia | 4,374 |
| Dominican Republic | 4,022 |
| Algeria | 3,423 |
| Brazil | 3,306 |
| Argentina | 3,209 |
| Portugal | 3,173 |
| Nicaragua | 2,656 |
| Ukraine | 2,555 |

As of 2025, immigrants make up 19.8% of the population. The 5 largest foreign countries of birth are Morocco, Colombia, Ecuador, Peru, and Romania.

== Politics ==
=== Institutions and status ===
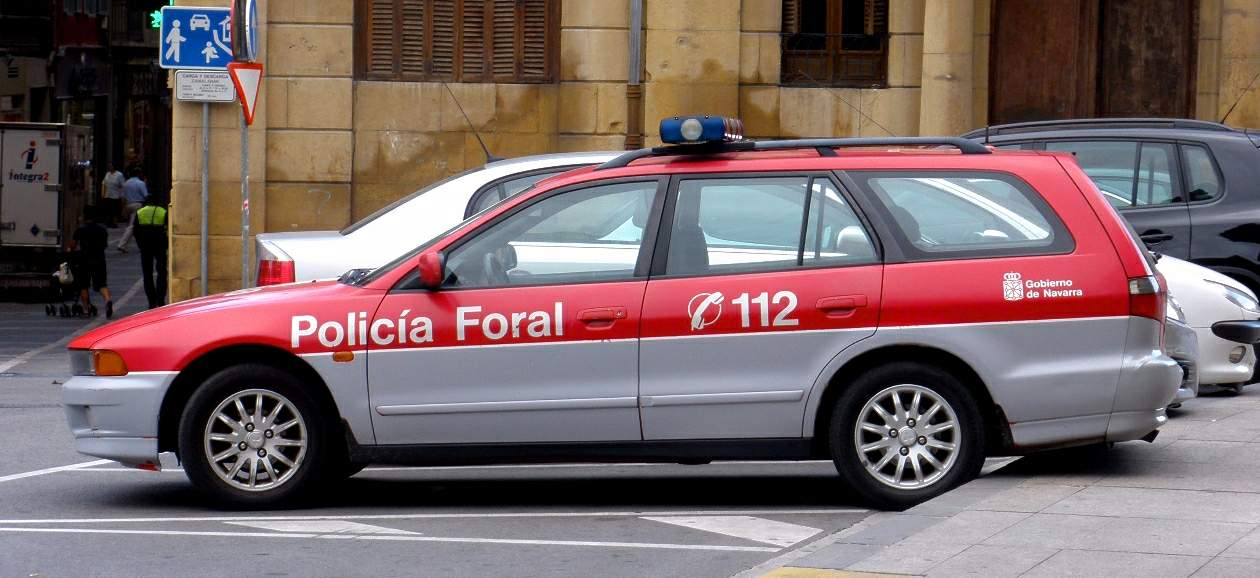
Patrol unit from the Policía Foral, the Navarrese autonomous police force, that largely replaces the Spanish National Police and the Civil Guard in this territory.

After the end of Franco's dictatorship, Navarre became one of the 17 Autonomous Communities in Spain. The community ceremonies, education, and social services, together with housing, urban development, and environment protection policies are under the responsibility of Navarre's political institutions. As in the rest of the communities, Navarre has a Parliament elected every four years, and the majority in this Parliament determines the president of the Community, who is in charge of Navarre's government. Unlike most other autonomous communities of Spain (but like the Basque Autonomous Community), Navarre has almost full responsibility for collecting and administering taxes which must follow the overall guidelines established by the Spanish government but may have some minor differences.

The first 3 presidents of the community belonged to the extinct Union of the Democratic Centre (UCD) party. After 1984 the government was ruled by either the Socialist Party of Navarre (PSN – PSOE, one of the federative components of the Spanish Socialist Workers' Party, main centre-left wing party in Spain) or the Navarrese People's Union (UPN) (a Navarrese party that had a long alliance with the People's Party (PP), main right-wing party in Spain). However, in 2015 Uxue Barkos (Geroa Bai) became president with the support of EH Bildu, Podemos and Izquierda-Ezkerra. She is the first Basque nationalist president in Navarre.

Basque nationalist parties also represent a sizeable part of the vote (around 31% in the 2015 elections), and a majority in most of the northern areas. Basque nationalist parties have as a key point in their agendas to merge Navarre into the Basque Autonomous Community by referendum (as predicted in the Spanish constitution). All Spain-based parties, as well as UPN and PSN, oppose this move.

=== Present-day political dynamics ===
Seat distribution in the Parliament of Navarre since 2023. EH Bildu (9) C/Z (3) Geroa Bai (7) PSN (11) UPN (15) PP (3) Vox (2)

Politics in Navarre have been marked by fierce rivalry between two blocs representing different national identities that are part of Navarre society: the pro-Basque EH Bildu and the Basque nationalist Geroa Bai parties, on the one side, and the institutional pro-Spanish parties, UPN, PP and PSN on the other. Parties on the pro-Basque spectrum demand further sovereignty in internal affairs of Navarre and closer relationship with the districts of the Basque Autonomous Community. Another 2013–2014 controversy refers to the alleged ideological profiling of public school Basque language teachers, billed as "ETA supporting teachers".

Since the establishment of Navarre's present status (the Amejoramiento, the 'Betterment') in 1982, the successive regional governments ruled by UPN and PSN have been shaken by frequent political instability and corruption scandals, with UPN's Miguel Sanz's term being the most stable and longest, extending from 2001 to 2011. Between 2012 and 2014, a series of corruption scandals broke out involving regional president Yolanda Barcina and other regional government officials that included influence peddling, embezzlement, misappropriation of funds and mismanagement leading to the bankruptcy of Caja Navarra. By November 2012, the PSN—UPN's standing ally in Navarre up to that point—backed down on its support of UPN, but refused to impeach Yolanda Barcina or search new political alliances, leaving a deadlocked government. The regional president, widely questioned in Navarre as of 2012 and relying only on the PP central government's backup, went on to urge the Constitutional Court to challenge several decisions made by the Parliament of Navarre.

After the latest scandal and corruption allegations affecting a secretary of her cabinet (Lourdes Goicoechea, regional public finance secretary) in February 2014, the Spanish home office secretary Jorge Fernández Díaz stepped in warning leading members of PSN that "Navarre is strategic for Spain", and asserting that any other political alliance means "supporting ETA". The Justice secretary in Madrid Alberto Ruiz Gallardón in turn stated that "the worst political error is not corruption" but getting along with Bildu (a Basque pro-independence coalition). In May 2015, the elections for Navarre Parliament left a better result for pro-Basque parties, which managed to establish an alliance, Uxue Barkos from Geroa Bai being elected president of Navarre for the period 2015 – 2019. June 2019 elections, however, turned the tide, when rightist forces reunited in the platform Navarra Suma, made up of UPN, PP and Ciudadanos, and garnered 20 MPs, 40% of the seats in the Parliament of Navarre, although both Geroa Bai and EH Bildu increased their vote share. Following the election results, PSN's María Chivite was elected president with the support provided by progressive forces, handing over Pamplona's council to Navarra Suma and explicitly excluding EH Bildu from any talks or alliances, but relying on its abstention for her inauguration.

In December 2017, the Navarrese parliament passed a law splitting teachers aspiring to work in the state-run education network into two different professional categories, one for those qualified in Basque and Spanish, and another for Spanish monolinguals, so thwarting with the vote of Izquierda-Ezkerra (integrated in the regional government) the new progressive government's plan to have just one; the latter echoes a long-running demand of education unions. In July 2018, the Constitutional Court of Spain suspended the Far Right's and Civil Servants' Victims Act passed by the Parliament of Navarre in 2015. Three months later, the chief executive officer of the National Police in Navarre stepped down for the disclosure of a fake Twitter account he owned that praised Antonio Tejero, as well as Vox leader Santiago Abascal as a new Jose Antonio, also insulting a number of Catalan and Basque nationalist and leftist figures. In October 2019, the High Court of Navarre ruled against the public use of bilingual signalling and institutional announcements in Mixed-Speaking and Non-Basque Speaking areas, also proscribing the consideration of Basque as a merit in job positions, unless strictly needed; the judgement sparked an uproar among some parties in the coalition government of Navarre, as well as EH Bildu, but was saluted by the PSN and Navarra Suma.

=== Administrative divisions ===
Navarre is divided into 12 comarcas and 4 subcomarcas:

| Comarca | Map |
|---|---|
| Baztan-Bidasoa | |
Erdialdea/Zona Media
Erribera/Ribera
Erriberagoiena/Ribera Alta
Estellerria/Tierra Estella
Montejurra
Estellerriko Erribera/Ribera Estellesa
Iruñerria/Comarca de Pamplona
Metropolialdea/Área Metropolitana
Ibarrak/Valles
Izarbeibar-Novenera/Valdizarbe-Novenera
Larraun-Leitzaldea
Pirinioak/Pirineos
Pirinioaurrea/Prepirineo
Sakana
Zangozerria/Comarca de Sangüesa

==== Municipalities ====
Navarre is also further divided into 272 municipalities:

- Abaigar
- Abarzuza
- Abaurregaina/Abaurrea Alta
- Abaurrepea/Abaurrea Baja
- Aberin
- Ablitas
- Adios
- Aguilar de Codés
- Aibar/Oibar
- Altsasu/Alsasua
- Allin
- Allo
- Améscoa Baja
- Ancín
- Andosilla
- Ansoáin
- Anue
- Añorbe
- Agoitz
- Araitz
- Arakil
- Aranarache
- Aranguren
- Arano
- Arantza
- Aras
- Arbizu
- Arce
- Los Arcos
- Arellano
- Areso
- Arguedas
- Aria
- Aribe
- Armañanzas
- Arróniz
- Arruazu
- Artajona
- Artazu
- Atez
- Auritz / Burguete
- Ayegui
- Azagra
- Azuelo
- Bakaiku
- Barañáin
- Barásoain
- Barbarin
- Bargota
- Barillas
- Basaburua
- Baztan
- Beintza-Labaien
- Beire
- Belascoáin
- Bera
- Berbinzana
- Beriáin
- Berrioplano
- Berriozar
- Bertizarana
- Betelu
- Bidaurreta
- Biurrun-Olcoz
- Buñuel
- Burgui-Burgi
- Burlada
- El Busto
- Cabanillas
- Cabredo
- Cadreita
- Caparroso
- Cárcar
- Carcastillo
- Cascante
- Cáseda
- Castejón
- Castillonuevo
- Cintruénigo
- Cirauqui
- Ciriza
- Cizur
- Corella
- Cortes
- Desojo
- Dicastillo
- Donamaria
- Doneztebe/Santesteban
- Echarri/Etxarri
- Eguesibar
- Elgorriaga
- Enériz
- Eratsun
- Ergoiena
- Erro
- Eslava
- Esparza de Salazar
- Espronceda
- Estella-Lizarra
- Esteribar
- Etayo
- Etxalar
- Etxarri-Aranatz
- Etxauri
- Eulate
- Ezcabarte
- Ezcároz - Ezkaroze
- Ezkurra
- Ezprogui
- Falces
- Fitero
- Fontellas
- Funes
- Fustiñana
- Galar
- Gallipienzo
- Gallués - Galoze
- Garaioa
- Garde
- Garínoain
- Garralda
- Genevilla
- Goizueta
- Goñi
- Güesa - Gorza
- Guesálaz
- Guirguillano
- Hiriberri/Villanueva de Aezkoa
- Huarte - Uharte
- Ibargoiti
- Igantzi
- Igúzquiza
- Imotz
- Irañeta
- Irurtzun
- Isaba/Izaba
- Ituren
- Iturmendi
- Iza
- Izagaondoa
- Izalzu - Itzaltzu
- Jaurrieta
- Juslapeña
- Lakuntza
- Lana
- Lantz
- Lapoblación
- Larraga
- Larraona
- Larraun
- Lazagurría
- Leache
- Legarda
- Legaria
- Leitza
- Lekunberri
- Leoz
- Lerga
- Lerín
- Lesaka
- Lezáun
- Liédena
- Lizoáin-Arriasgoiti
- Lodosa
- Lónguida - Longida
- Lumbier
- Luquin
- Luzaide/Valcarlos
- Mañeru
- Marañón
- Marcilla
- Mélida
- Mendavia
- Mendaza
- Mendigorría
- Metauten
- Milagro
- Mirafuentes
- Miranda de Arga
- Monreal
- Monteagudo
- Morentin
- Mues
- Murchante
- Murieta
- Murillo El Cuende
- Murillo El Fruto
- Muruzábal
- Navascués
- Nazar
- Noáin (Valle de Elorz)-Noain (Elortzibar)
- Obanos
- Oco
- Ochagavía/Otsagabia
- Odieta
- Oitz
- Olaibar
- Olazti/Olazagutía
- Olejua
- Olite
- Olóriz
- Olza
- Ollo
- Orbaitzeta
- Orbara
- Orcoyen
- Orísoain
- Oronz
- Oroz-Betelu
- Orreaga/Roncesvalles
- Oteiza
- Pamplona/Iruña
- Peralta
- Petilla de Aragón
- Piedramillera
- Pitillas
- Puente la Reina/Gares
- Pueyo
- Ribaforada
- Romanzado
- Roncal – Erronkari
- Sada
- Saldías
- Salinas de Oro
- San Adrián
- San Martín de Unx
- Sangüesa/Zangoza
- Sansol
- Santacara
- Sarriés - Sartze
- Sartaguda
- Sesma
- Sorlada
- Sunbilla
- Tafalla
- Tiebas-Muruarte de Reta
- Tirapu
- Torralba del Río
- Torres del Río
- Tudela
- Tulebras
- Úcar
- Uharte-Arakil
- Ujué
- Ultzama
- Unciti
- Unzué
- Urdazubi/Urdax
- Urdiain
- Urraúl Alto
- Urraúl Bajo
- Urrotz
- Urroz
- Urzainki
- Uterga
- Uztárroz - Uztarrotze
- Valtierra
- Viana
- Vidángoz - Bidankoze
- Villafranca
- Villamayor de Monjardín
- Villatuerta
- Villava/Atarrabia
- Javier
- Yerri
- Yesa
- Zabalza
- Ziordia
- Zizur Mayor/Zizur Nagusia
- Zubieta
- Zugarramurdi
- Zúñiga

==== Denomination of local entities ====
The official denomination of Navarran municipalities and villages are regulated according to the Foral Basque Law. It distinguishes three different types of formulas:

- Unique denominations: the use of Basque in legal documents is the same when compared with Spanish independently. Examples: Lantz or Beintza-Labaien.
- Compounded denominations: They have a unique denomination formula formed from the Spanish and Basque toponyms in Spanish or Basque and are united by the symbol "-" or "/". Its use (the compounded denomination) is the same in Spanish as in Basque. Examples: Doneztebe/Santesteban, Orreaga/Roncesvalles, Estella-Lizarra.
- Double denominations: The toponym, in Basque or Spanish is dependent on the language and how it is used in the text. Examples: Pamplona <> Iruña, Villava <> Atarrabia, Aibar <> Oibar.

== Culture ==
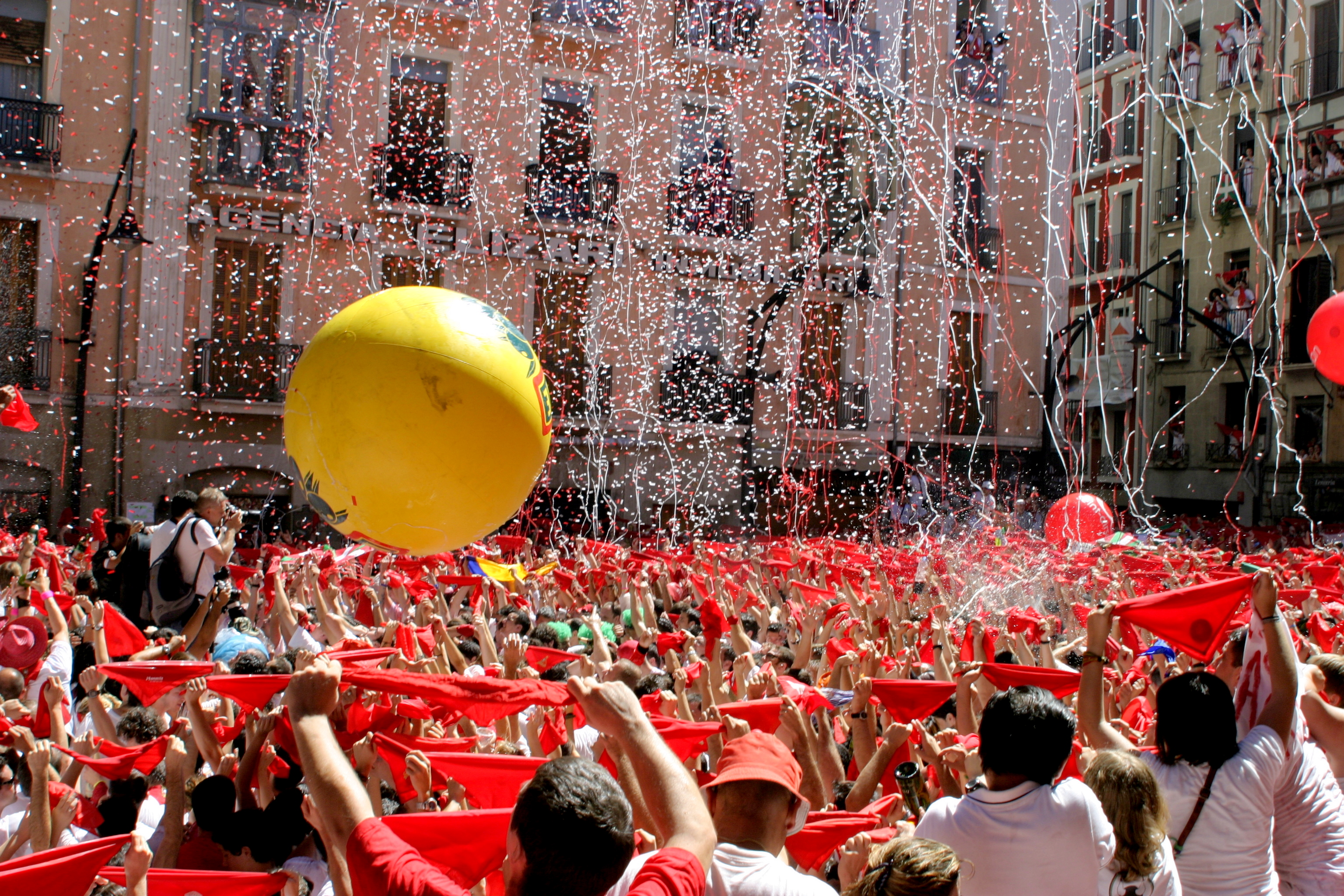
Sanfermines in Pamplona

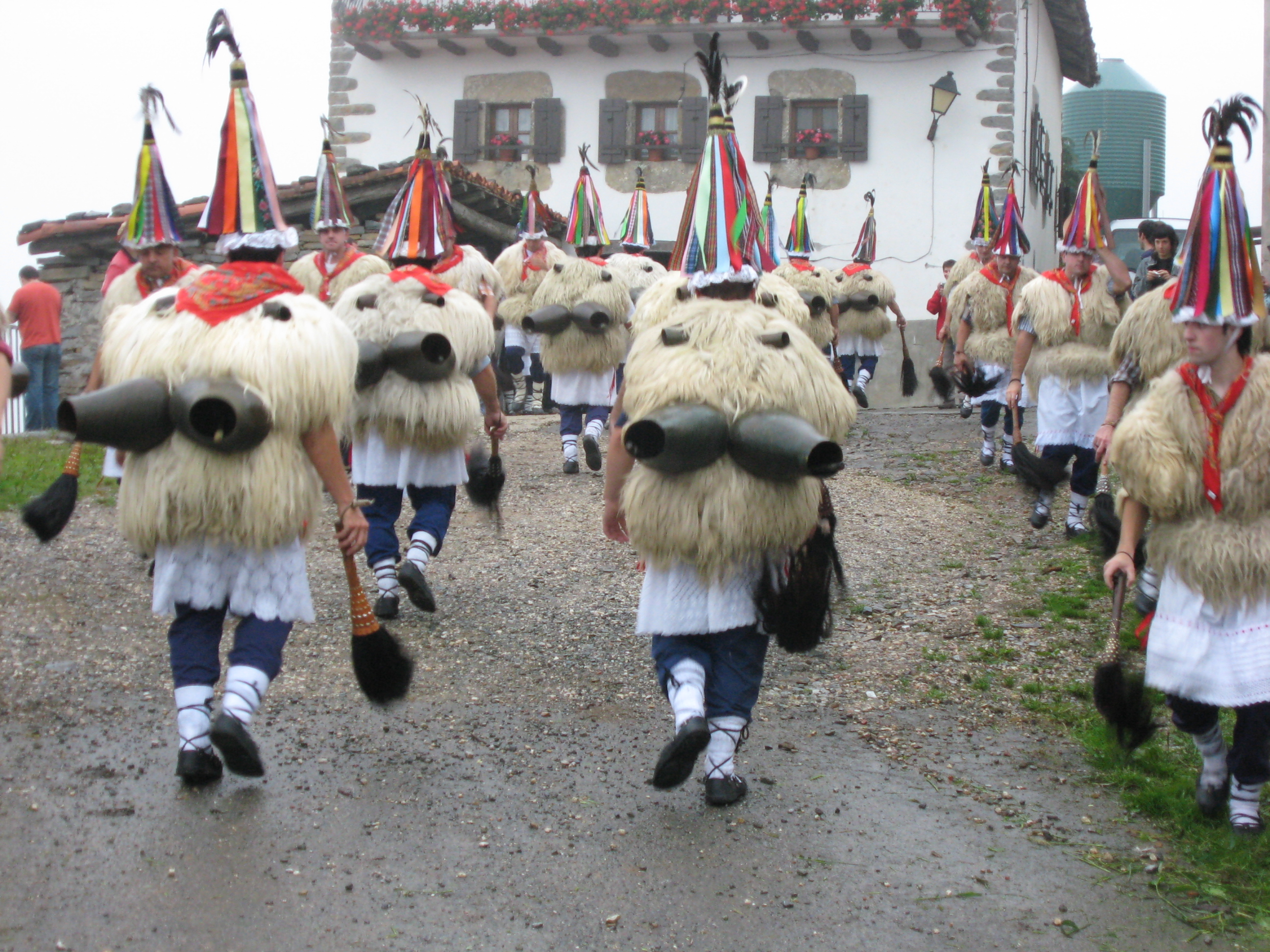
Joaldun feast in January

Navarre is a mixture of its Basque tradition, the Trans-Pyrenean influx of people and ideas and Mediterranean influences coming from the Ebro. The Ebro valley is amenable to wheat, vegetables, wine, and even olive trees as in Aragon and La Rioja. It was a part of the Roman Empire, inhabited by the Vascones, later controlled on its southern fringes by the Muslim Banu Qasi, whose authority was taken over by the taifa kingdom of Tudela in the 11th century.

During the Reconquista, Navarre gained little ground at the expense of the Muslims, since its southern boundary had already been established by the time of the Battle of Las Navas de Tolosa in 1212. Starting in the 11th century, the Way of Saint James grew in importance. It brought pilgrims, traders and Christian soldiers from the north. Gascons and Occitans from beyond the Pyrenees (called Franks) received self-government and other privileges to foster settlement in Navarrese towns, and they brought their crafts, culture and Romance languages.

Jews and Muslims were persecuted both north and south of Navarre, expelled for the most part during the late 15th century to the early 16th century. The kingdom struggled to maintain its separate identity in 14th and 15th centuries, and after King Ferdinand V forcibly conquered Navarre after the death of his wife Queen Isabella, he extended the Castilian expulsion and forcible integration orders applicable to conversos and mudejars of 1492 to the former kingdom. Therefore, Tudela in particular could no longer serve as a refuge after the Inquisitors were allowed.

== Economy ==
Navarre is one of the wealthiest regions in Spain per capita, with a diversified economy primarily focused on the energy sector, healthcare services and manufacturing. The gross domestic product (GDP) of the autonomous community was 20.3 billion euros as of 2018, accounting for 1.7% of Spanish economic output. GDP per capita adjusted for purchasing power was 33,700 euros or 112% of the EU27 average in the same year. The GDP per employee was 109% of the EU average.

The unemployment rate stood at 10.2% in 2017 and was the lowest in the country.

| Year | 2006 | 2007 | 2008 | 2009 | 2010 | 2011 | 2012 | 2013 | 2014 | 2015 | 2016 | 2017 |
|---|---|---|---|---|---|---|---|---|---|---|---|---|
| unemployment rate (in %) | 5.4% | 4.7% | 6.8% | 10.8% | 11.9% | 13.0% | 16.2% | 17.9% | 15.7% | 13.8% | 12.5% | 10.2% |

== Transport ==
=== Air ===
Pamplona Airport is the only airport in the region which provides flights to Madrid, Gran Canaria, Santa Cruz de Tenerife and Ibiza which are operated by Iberia and Binter Canarias.

However, other airports such as Bilbao Airport, Logroño–Agoncillo Airport, San Sebastián Airport, Zaragoza Airport and Biarritz Pays Basque Airport in France are also used by air travellers from the region.

== Energy policy ==
Navarre leads Europe in its use of renewable energy technology and planned to reach 100% renewable electricity generation by 2010. By 2004, 61% of the region's electricity was generated by renewable sources consisting of 43.6% from 28 wind farms, 12% from over 100 small-scale water turbines, and 5.3% from 2 biomass and 2 biogas plants. In addition, the region had what was then Spain's largest photovoltaic power plant at Montes de Cierzo de Tudela (1.2 MWp capacity) plus several hundred smaller photovoltaic installations.

Developments since 2004 have included further photovoltaic plants at Larrión (0.25 MWp) and another at Castejón (2.44 MWp), also once the largest in Spain.

== See also ==
- Basque Country (greater region)
- Caja Navarra
- Kings of Navarre
- Lower Navarre
- Navarrese nationalism
- History of Pamplona
- Nueva Navarra
- Parliament of Navarre
- Renewable energy in the European Union
