= Unzué (disambiguation) =

Unzué is a town in Spain.

Unzué may also refer to:

== People ==
- Eusebio Unzué (born 1955), Spanish cycling manager
- Juan Carlos Unzué (born 1967), Spanish footballer
- Marta Unzué (born 1988), Spanish footballer

== Other uses ==
- Unzué Palace, presidential residence of the Argentine Republic
