= Garralda =

Human settlement in Spain

Coordinates: 42°57′N 1°17′W

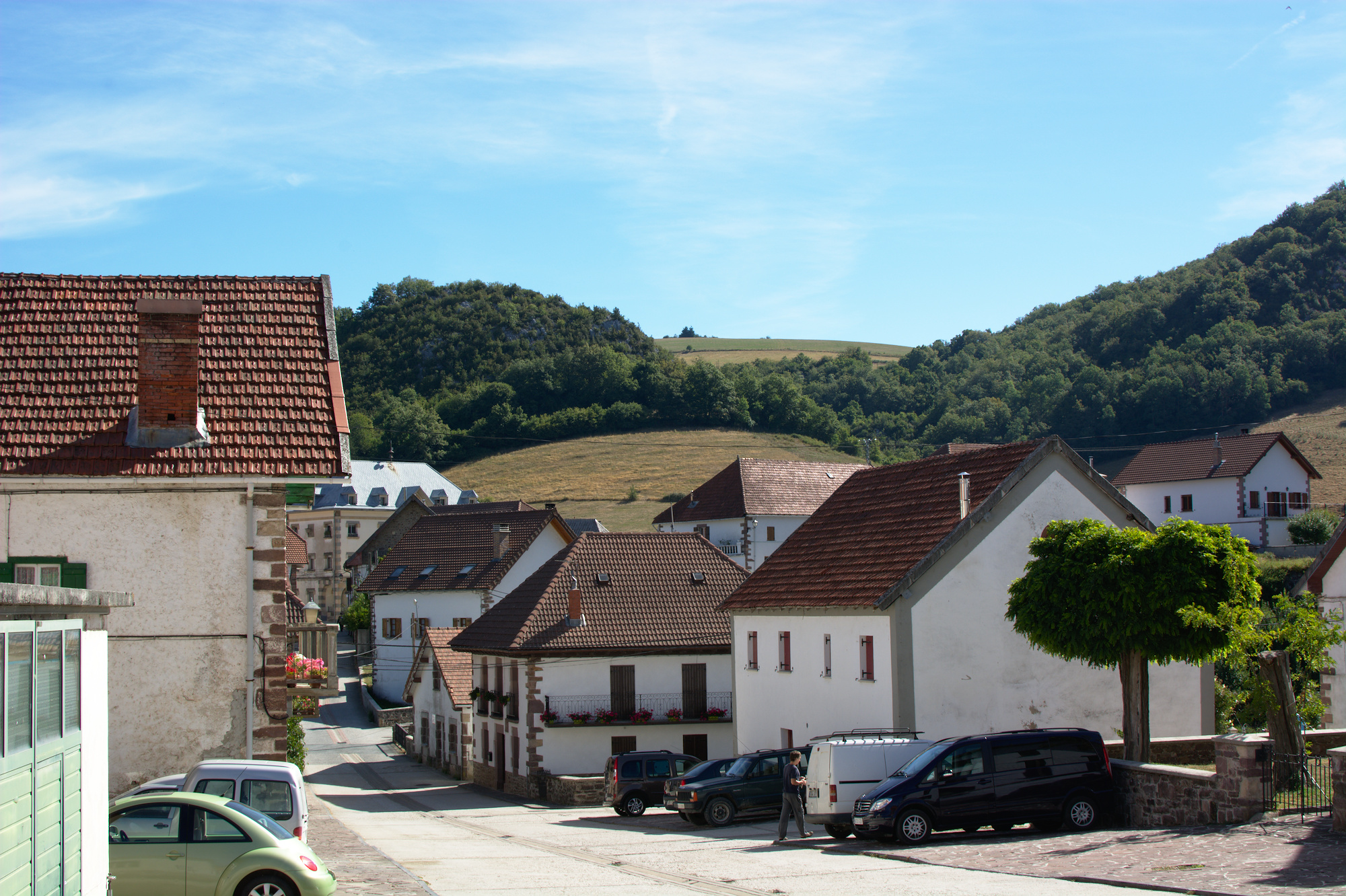
Street of Garralda

Garralda is a town and municipality located in the province and autonomous community of Navarre, northern Spain.
