= Tirapu =

Autonomous community of Navarre, Spain

Coordinates: 42°39′N 1°42′W

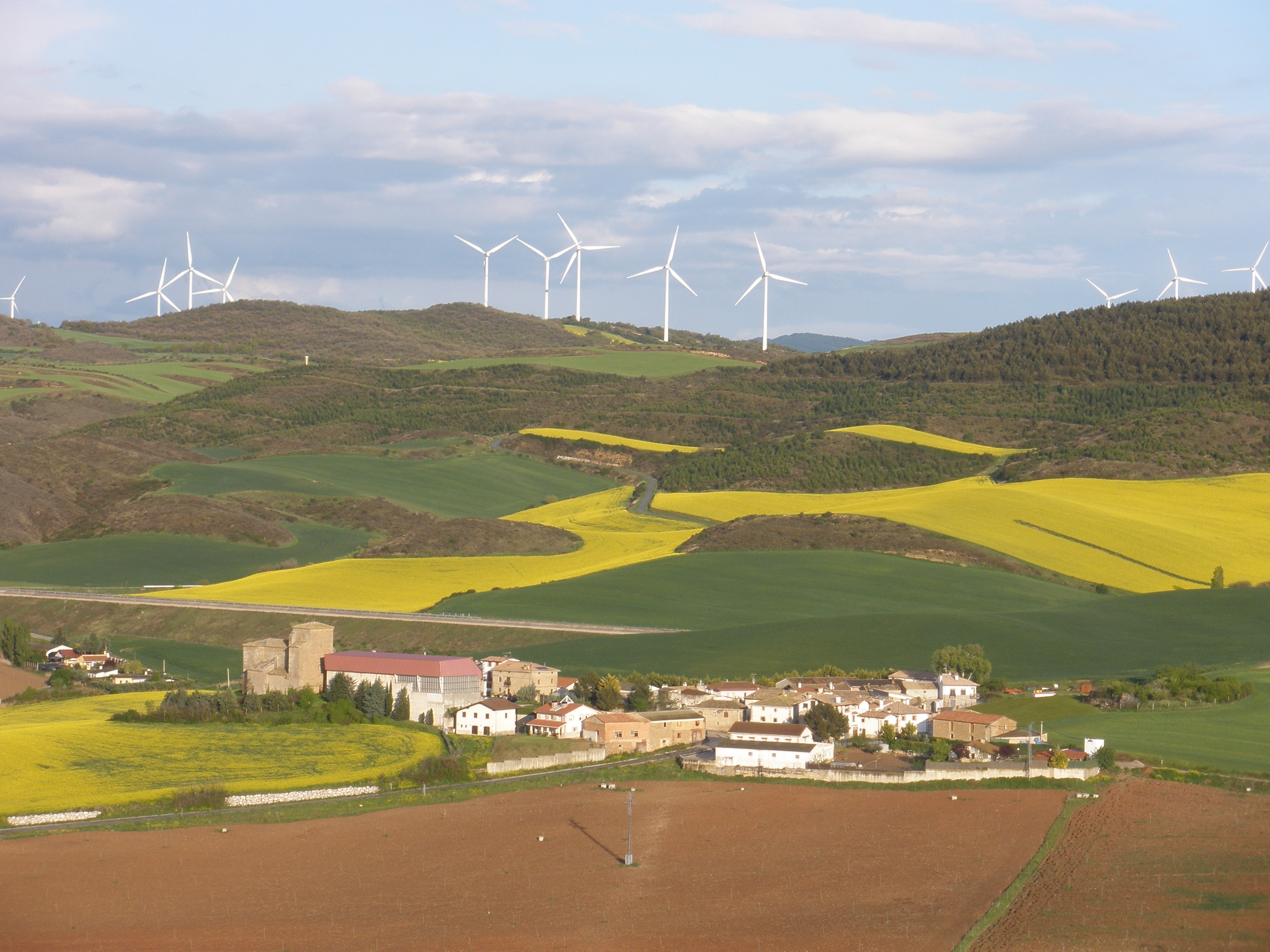
View of Tirapu and the mills

Tirapu is a town and municipality located in the province and autonomous community of Navarre, northern Spain.
