= Izagaondoa =

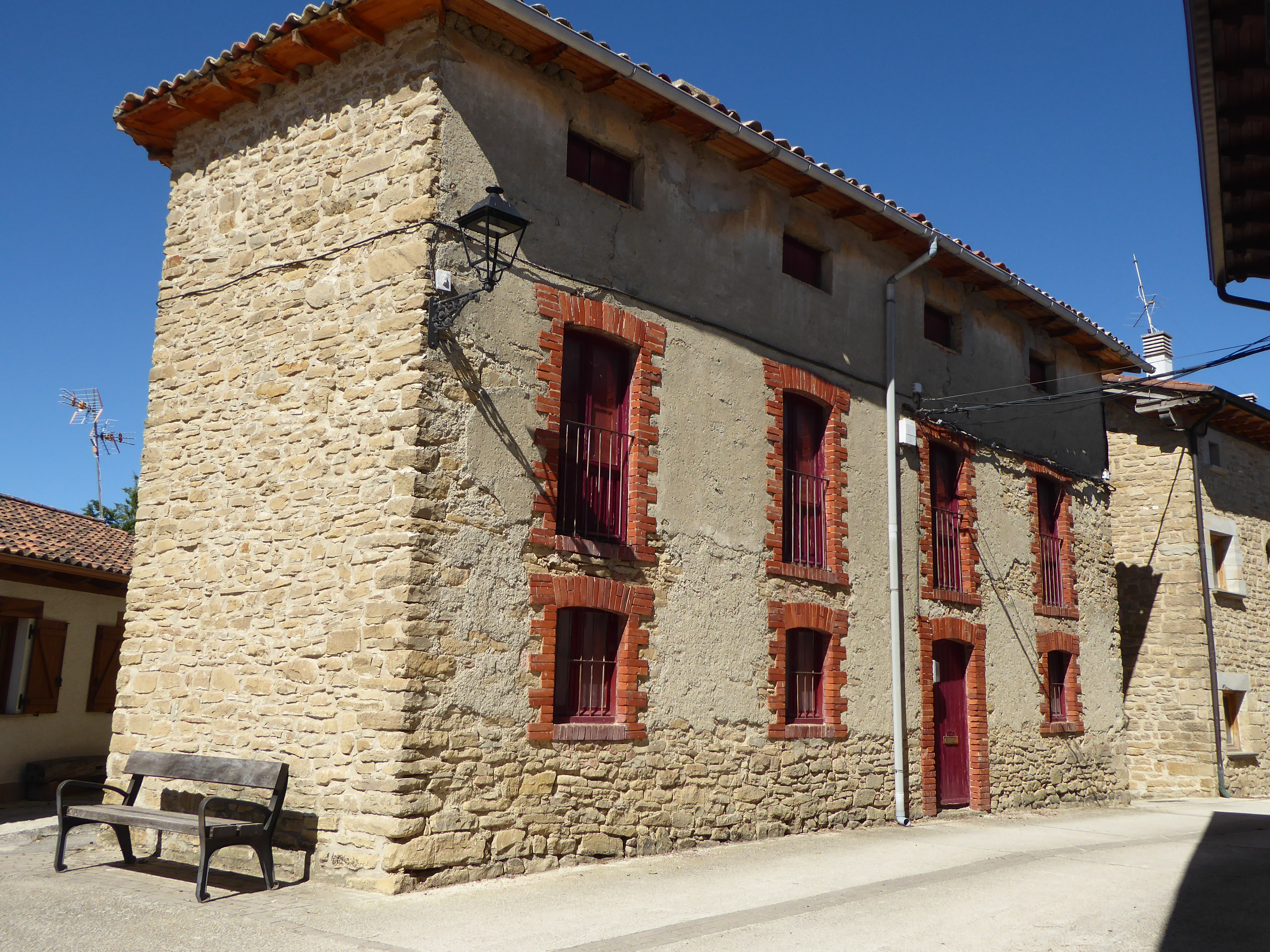
- Ardanatz in Izagaondoa

- Coat of arms

- Location of Izagaondoa within Navarre Location of Izagaondoa within Spain
- Coordinates: 42.753°N 1.421°W
- Country: Spain
- Autonomous community: Navarra

Government
  - Mayor: Elsa Plano Urdaci

Area
  - Total: 59.63 km^{2} (23.02 sq mi)
- Elevation: 647 m (2,123 ft)

Population (2025-01-01)
  - Total: 153
  - Density: 2.57/km^{2} (6.65/sq mi)
- Time zone: UTC+1 (CET)
  - Summer (DST): UTC+2 (CEST)

Izagaondoa is a town and municipality located in the province and autonomous community of Navarre, in northern Spain.
