= Metauten =

Town and municipality in Navarre, Spain

Coordinates: 42°40′43″N 2°07′31″W

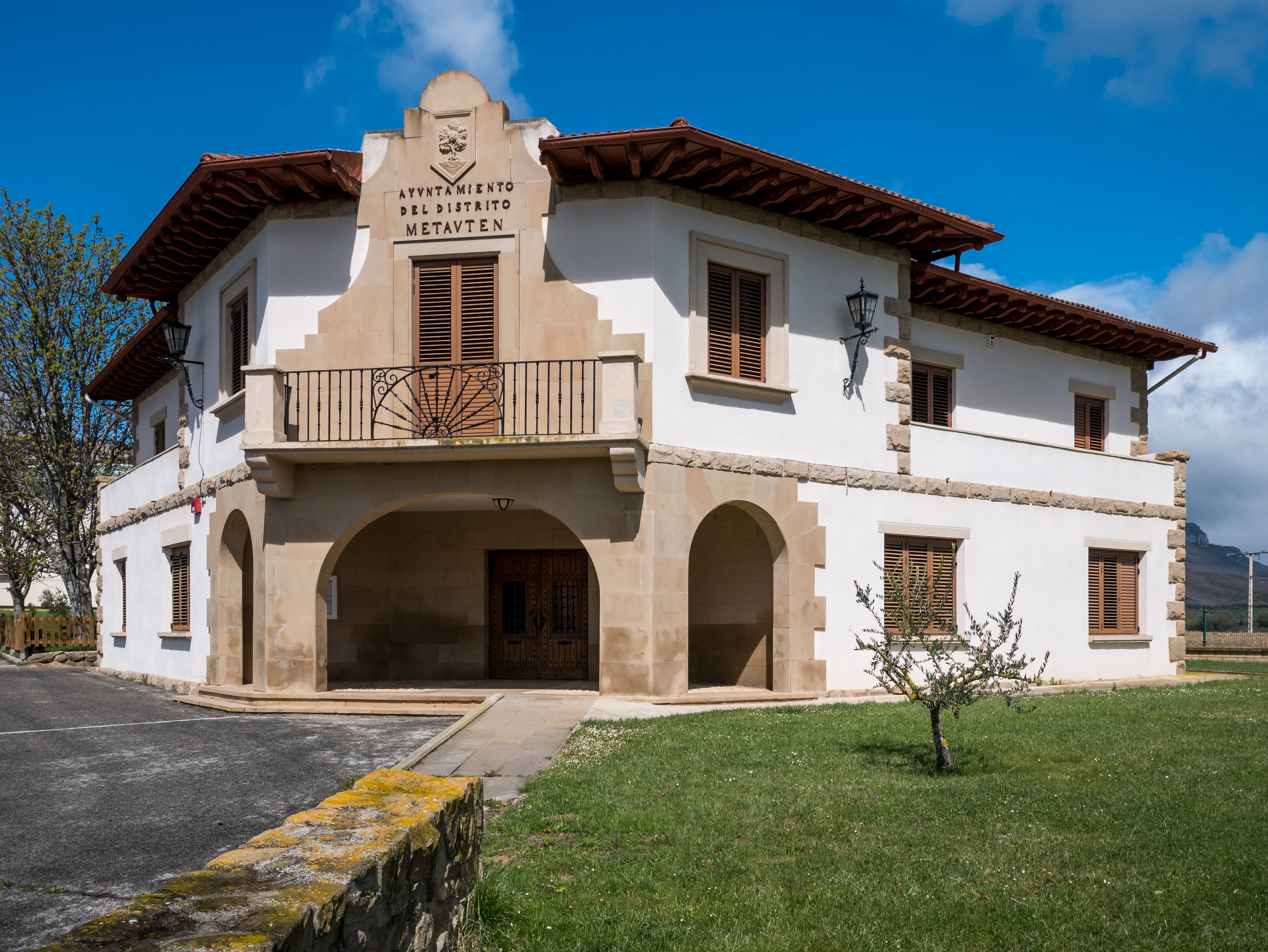
Town hall of Metauten

Metauten is a town and municipality located in the province and autonomous community of Navarre, northern Spain.
