= Allín =

Coordinates: 42°42′32″N 2°04′32″W

- Flag Coat of arms

- Location in Spain.
- Country: Spain
- Autonomous community: Navarra

Area
  - Total: 41.85 km^{2} (16.16 sq mi)
- Elevation: 520 m (1,710 ft)

Population (2025-01-01)
  - Total: 881
  - Density: 21.1/km^{2} (54.5/sq mi)
- Time zone: UTC+1 (CET)
  - Summer (DST): UTC+2 (CEST)
- Website: www.aytoallin.es

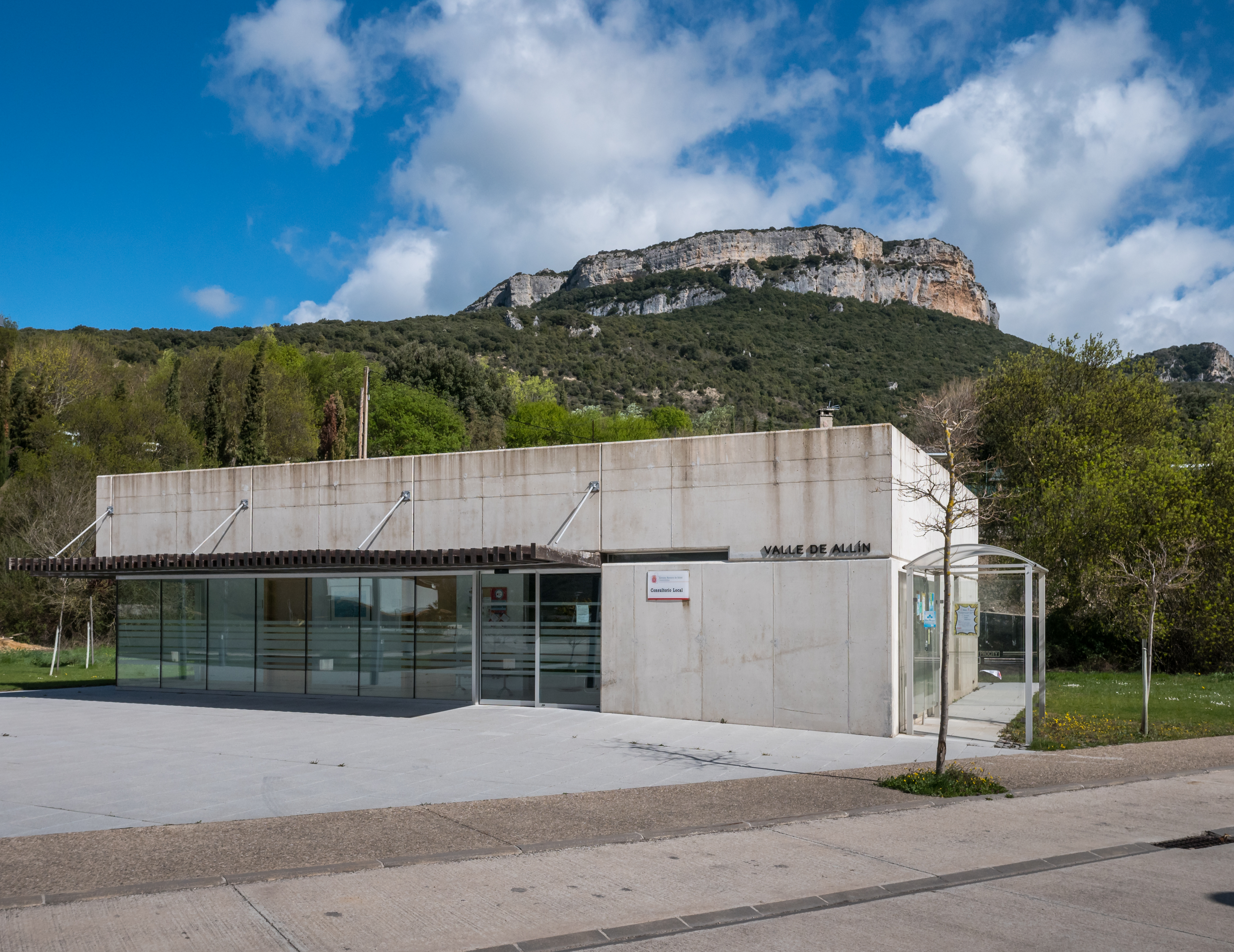
Allín Medical Centre

Allín is a town and municipality located in the province and autonomous community of Navarra, northern Spain.
