= Mirafuentes =

Coordinates: 42°37′N 2°16′W

- Municipality
- Coat of arms

- Location in Navarre
- Country: Spain
- Autonomous Community: Navarre
- Merindad: Estella

Government
  - Mayor: José Andrés Chasco Ganuza

Area
  - Total: 2.8 km^{2} (1.1 sq mi)
- Elevation: 648 m (2,126 ft)

Population (2025-01-01)
  - Total: 56
  - Density: 20/km^{2} (52/sq mi)
- Time zone: UTC+1 (CET)
  - Summer (DST): UTC+2 (CEST)
- Postal code: 31219
- Official language(s): Basque, Spanish

Mirafuentes (Basque: Iturriaga) is a town and municipality located in the province and autonomous community of Navarre, northern Spain.

This town is close to the Codés mountain range, part of which falls within its municipal term.
