= Elgorriaga =

Municipality of Navarre, Spain

Coordinates: 43°08′N 1°41′W

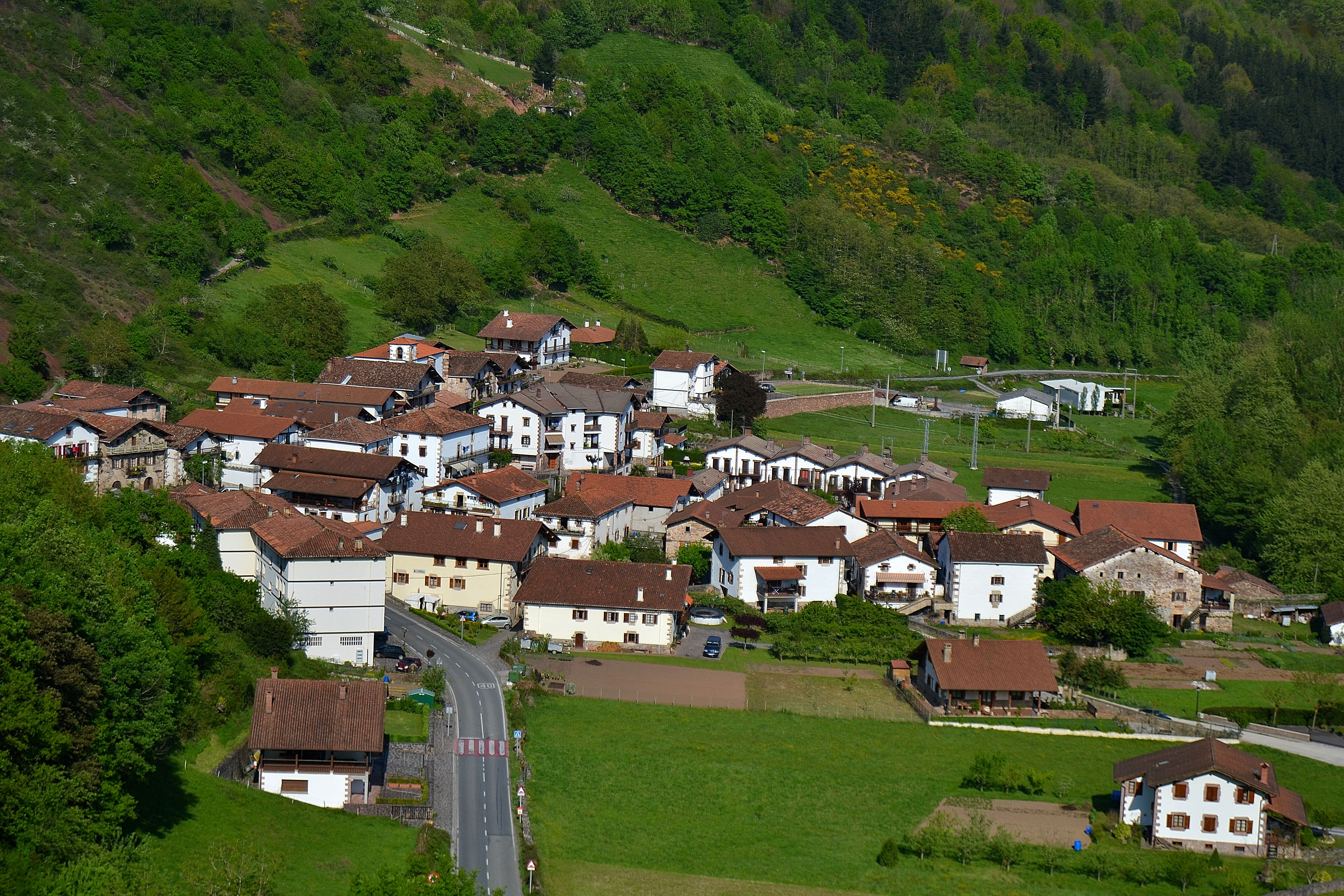
Bird's eye view of Elgorriaga, Navarre, Basque Country

Elgorriaga is a town and municipality located in the province and autonomous community of Navarre, northern Spain.
