= Larraona =

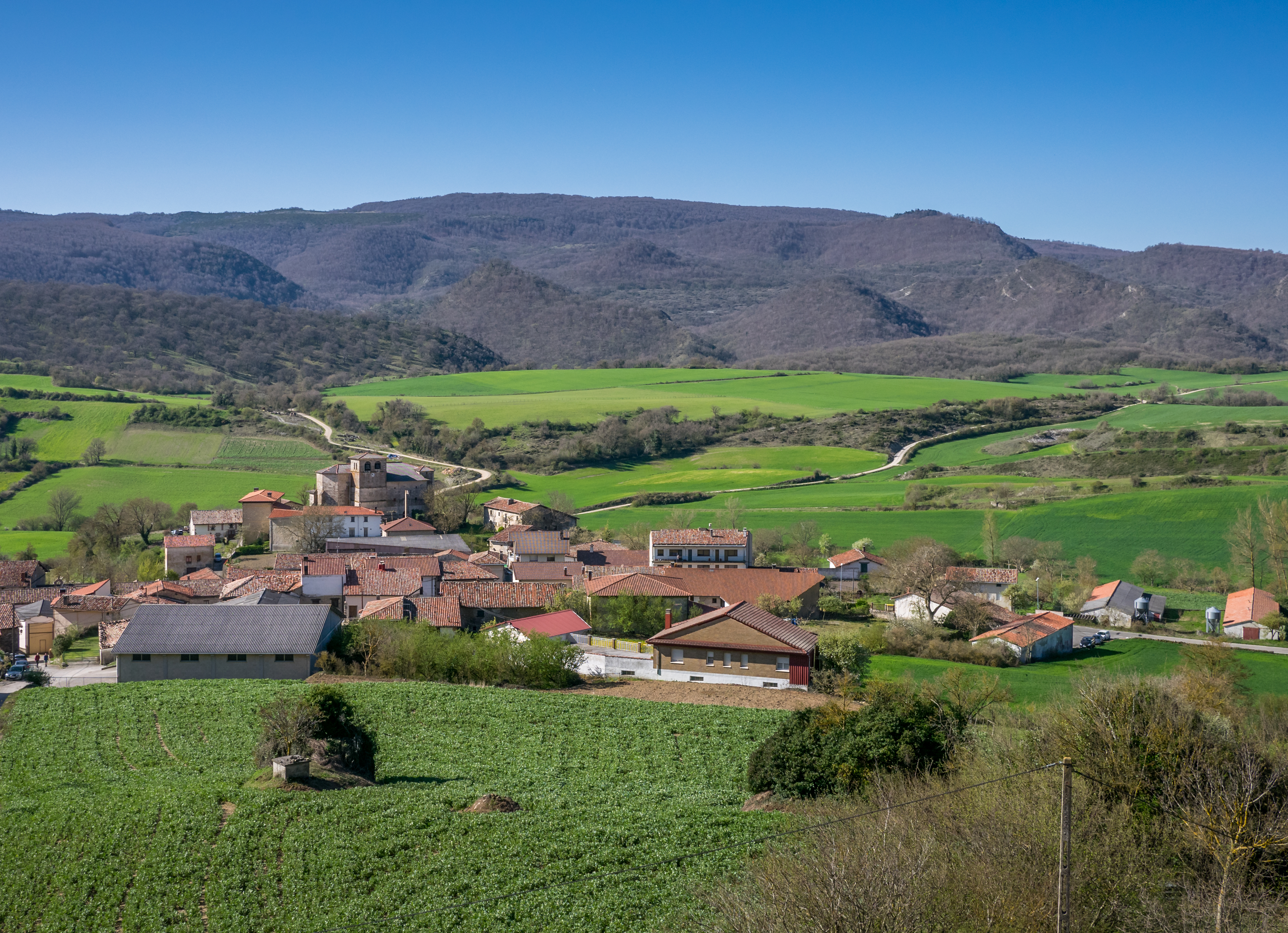

- Coat of arms

- Location of Larraona within Navarre Location of Larraona within Spain
- Coordinates: 42°46′50″N 2°15′22″W
- Country: Spain
- Autonomous community: Navarra

Government
  - Mayor: Maria Flora Gaviria Andueza

Area
  - Total: 8 km^{2} (3.1 sq mi)
- Elevation: 772 m (2,533 ft)

Population (2025-01-01)
  - Total: 100
  - Density: 13/km^{2} (32/sq mi)
- Time zone: UTC+1 (CET)
  - Summer (DST): UTC+2 (CEST)

Larraona (Basque: Larragoa) is a town and municipality located in the province and autonomous community of Navarre, northern Spain.
