= Aranarache =

Town in Navarre, Spain

Coordinates: 42°47′N 2°13′W

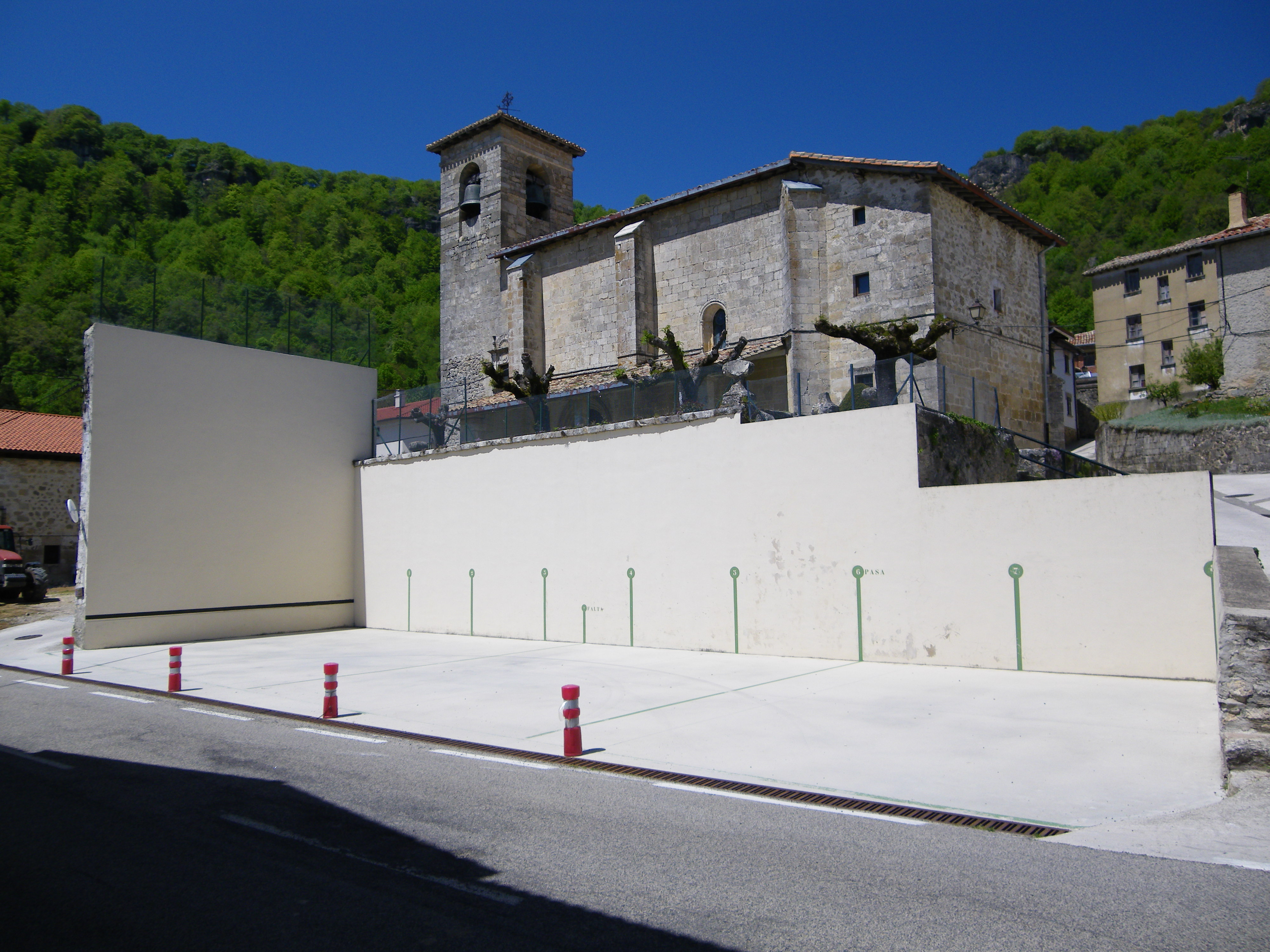
Pelota court and church in Aranaratxe, Navarre, Spain

Aranarache's coat of arms

Aranarache (Basque: Aranaratxe) is a town and municipality located in the province and autonomous community of Navarre, northern Spain.

Aranarache has a population of 86 inhabitants. It is located below the Arnotegi peak, Urbasa range.
