= Orbara =

Municipality of Navarre, Spain

Coordinates: 42°58′N 1°14′W

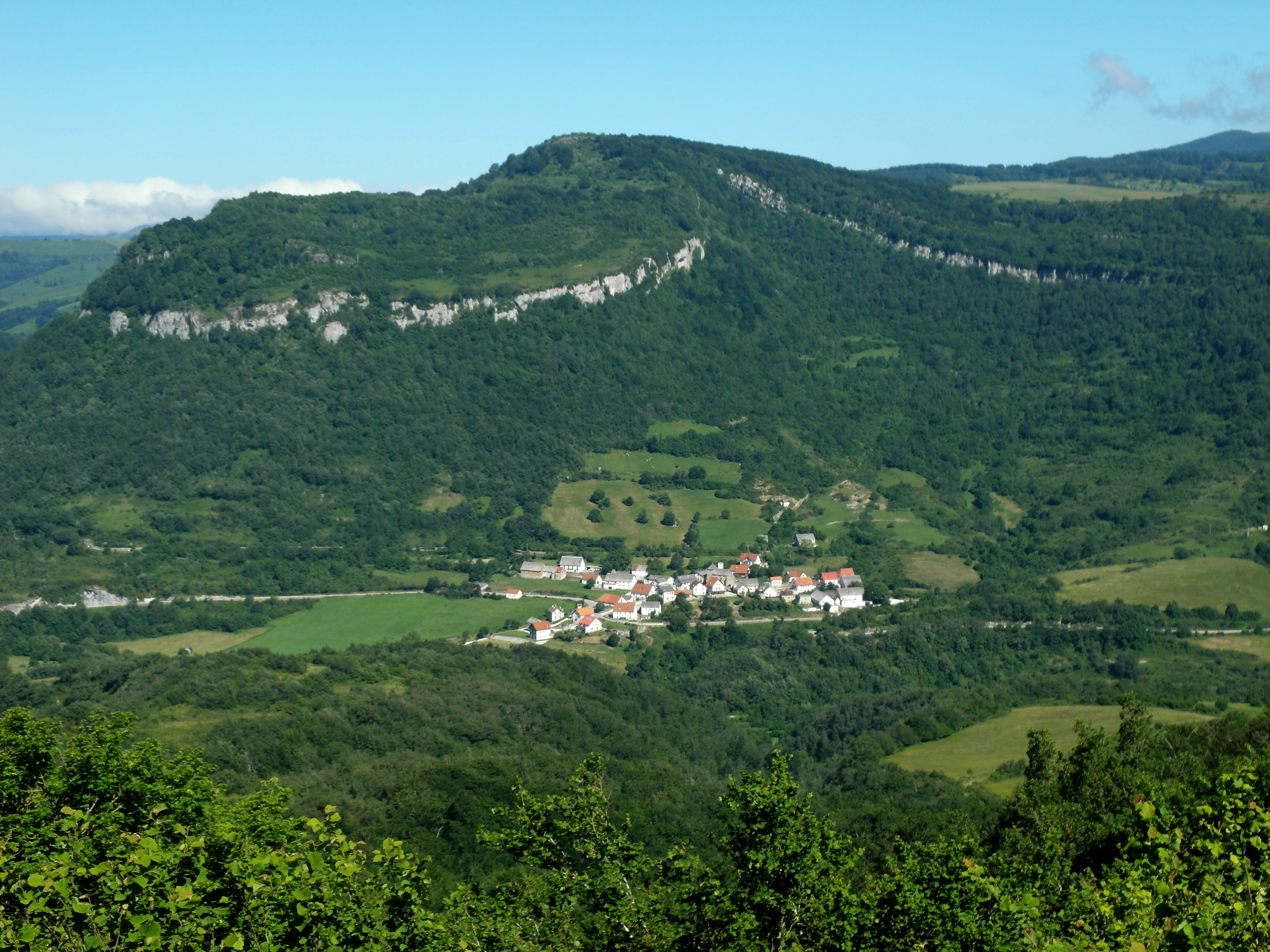
Aerial view of Orbara

Orbara is a town and municipality located in the province and autonomous community of Navarre, northern Spain.
