= Abáigar =

Coordinates: 42°39′0″N 2°10′59″W

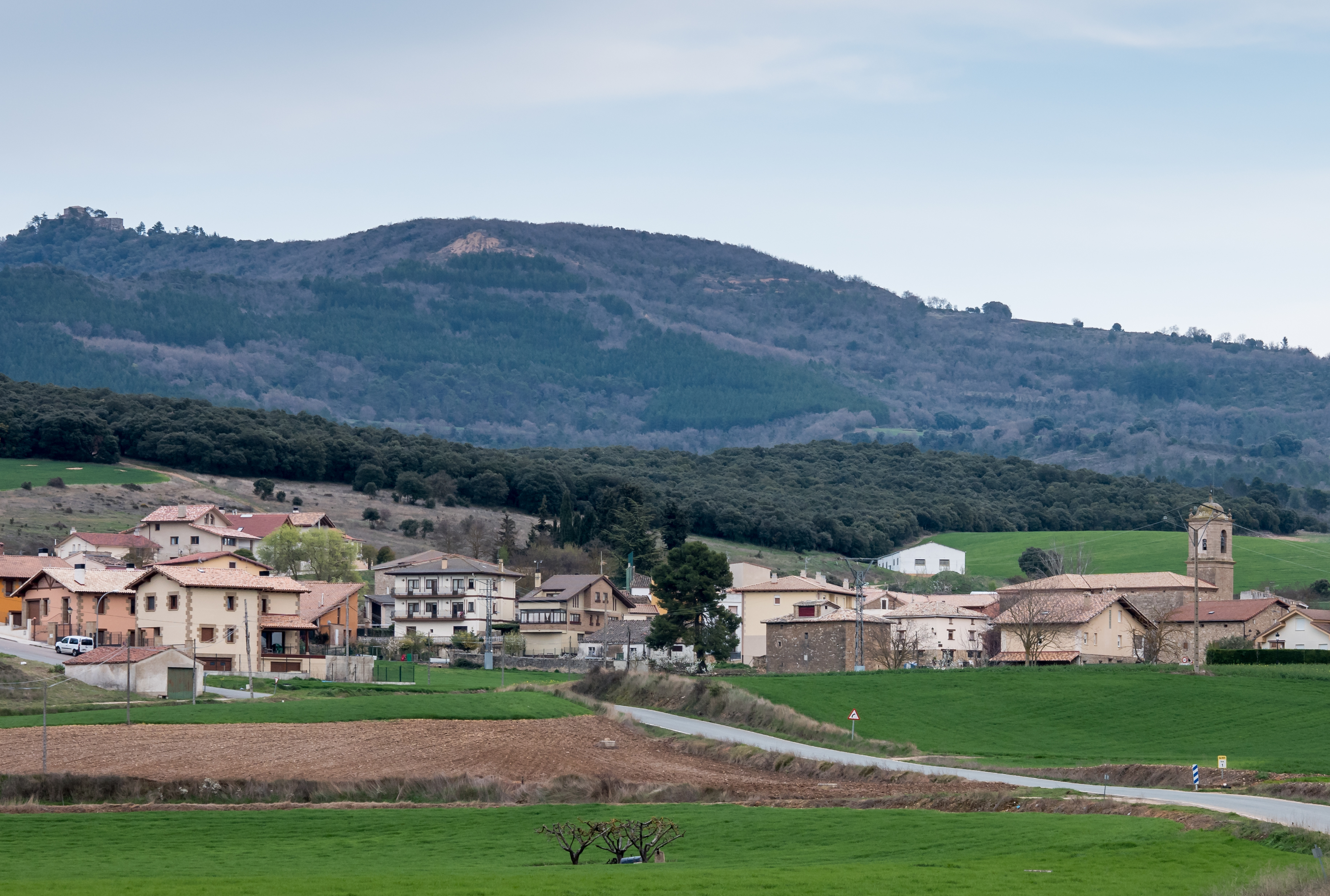
- View of Abáigar

- Coat of arms

- Location in Spain.
- Country: Spain
- Autonomous community: Navarra

Area
  - Total: 4.86 km^{2} (1.88 sq mi)
- Elevation: 498 m (1,634 ft)

Population (2025-01-01)
  - Total: 74
  - Density: 15/km^{2} (39/sq mi)
- Time zone: UTC+1 (CET)
  - Summer (DST): UTC+2 (CEST)
- Website: www.abaigar.es

Abáigar is a town and municipality located in the province and autonomous community of Navarre, northern Spain.

The municipality is part of the area (comarca) of Tierra Estella. It covers an area of 4.9 km^{2}. The municipality is located at a distance about 280 km northeast of Madrid, 47 km southwest of Pamplona.

The name comes from the Basque language (h)abe igar with the meaning of "dry tree".

== Population ==
Demographic evolution
1897	1900	1930	1940	1950	1960	1970	1975	1981	1991	1999	2017
206	216	229	210	232	201	150	110	103	95	99	88
