= Leoz =

Town and municipality in Navarre, Spain

Coordinates: 42°38′42″N 1°31′9″W

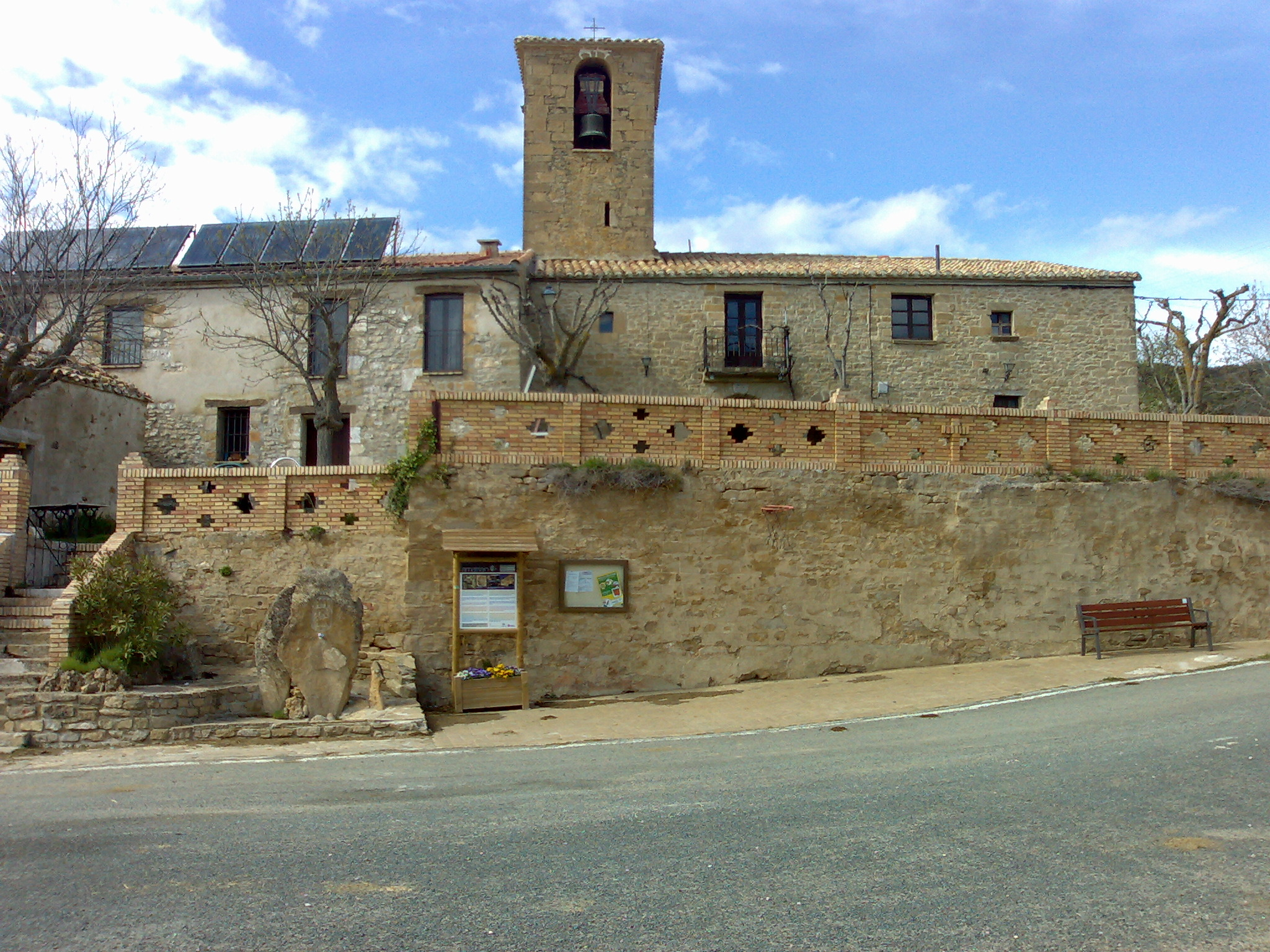
Leoz

Leoz (Basque: Leotz) is a town and municipality located in the province and autonomous community of Navarre, northern Spain.
