= Jaurrieta =

Municipality in Navarre, Spain

Coordinates: 42°53′N 1°08′W

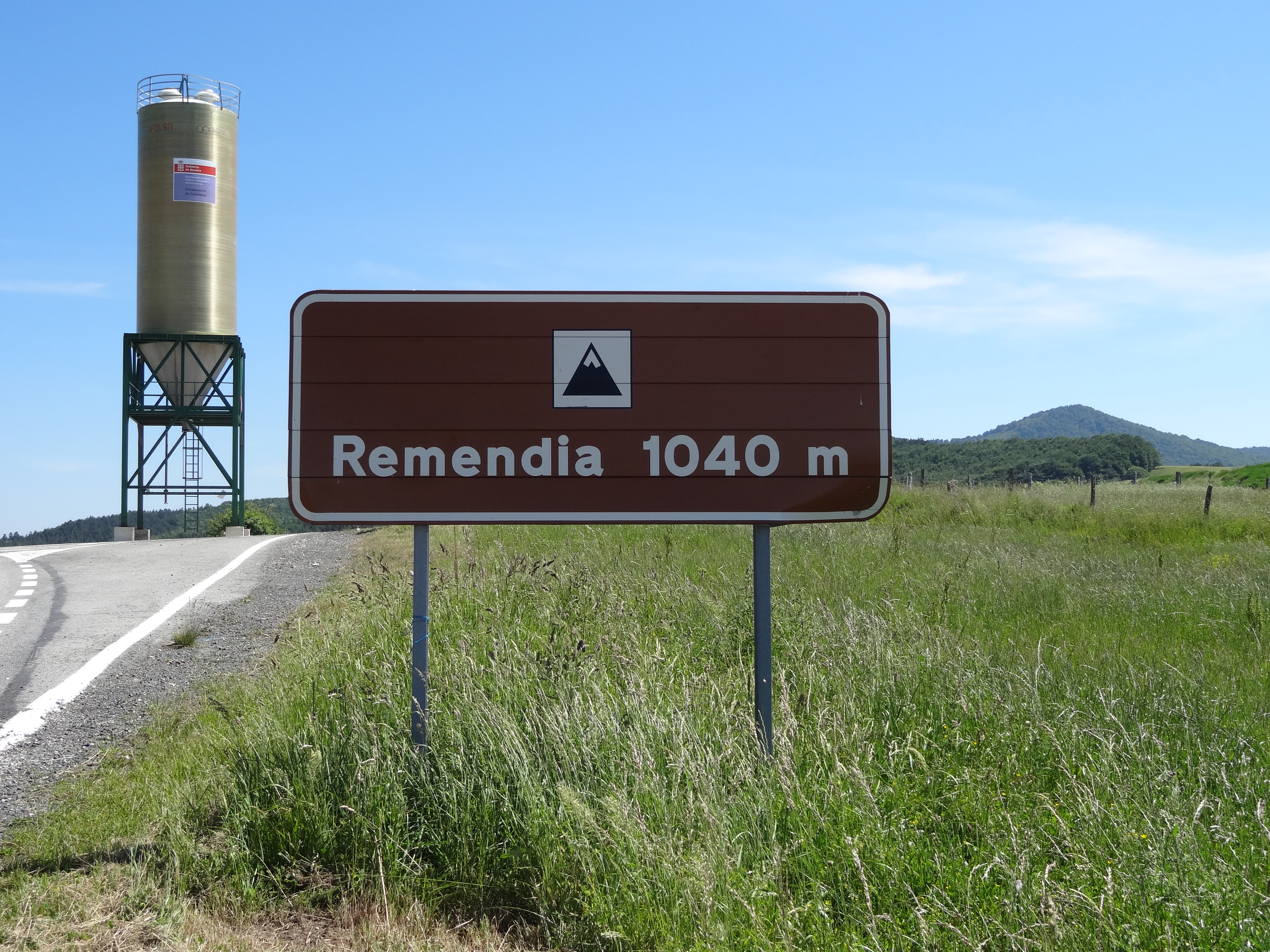
Picture of a mountain near Jaurrieta

Jaurrieta or Eaurta is a town and municipality located in the province and autonomous community of Navarre, northern Spain.

== Mayor ==
Nekane Moso Elizari, Jaurrieta's mayor since 2011, died in January 2022.
