= Guesálaz – Gesalatz =

Town and municipality in northern Spain

Coordinates: 42°45′N 1°55′W

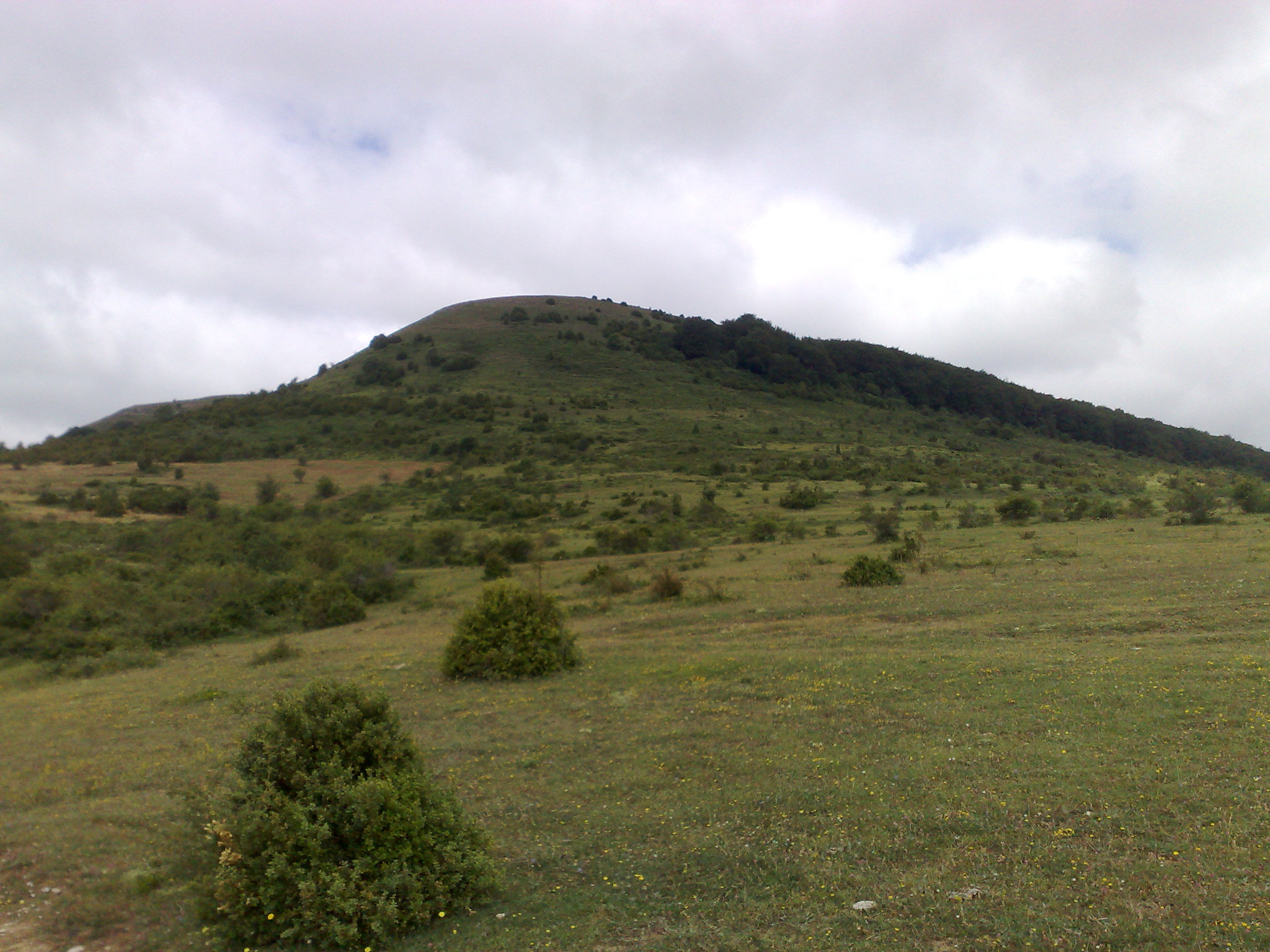

Guesálaz (Basque: Gesalatz) is a town and municipality located in the province and autonomous community of Navarre, northern Spain.
