= Pueyo, Navarre =

Town in Navarre, Spain

Coordinates: 42°34′N 1°39′W

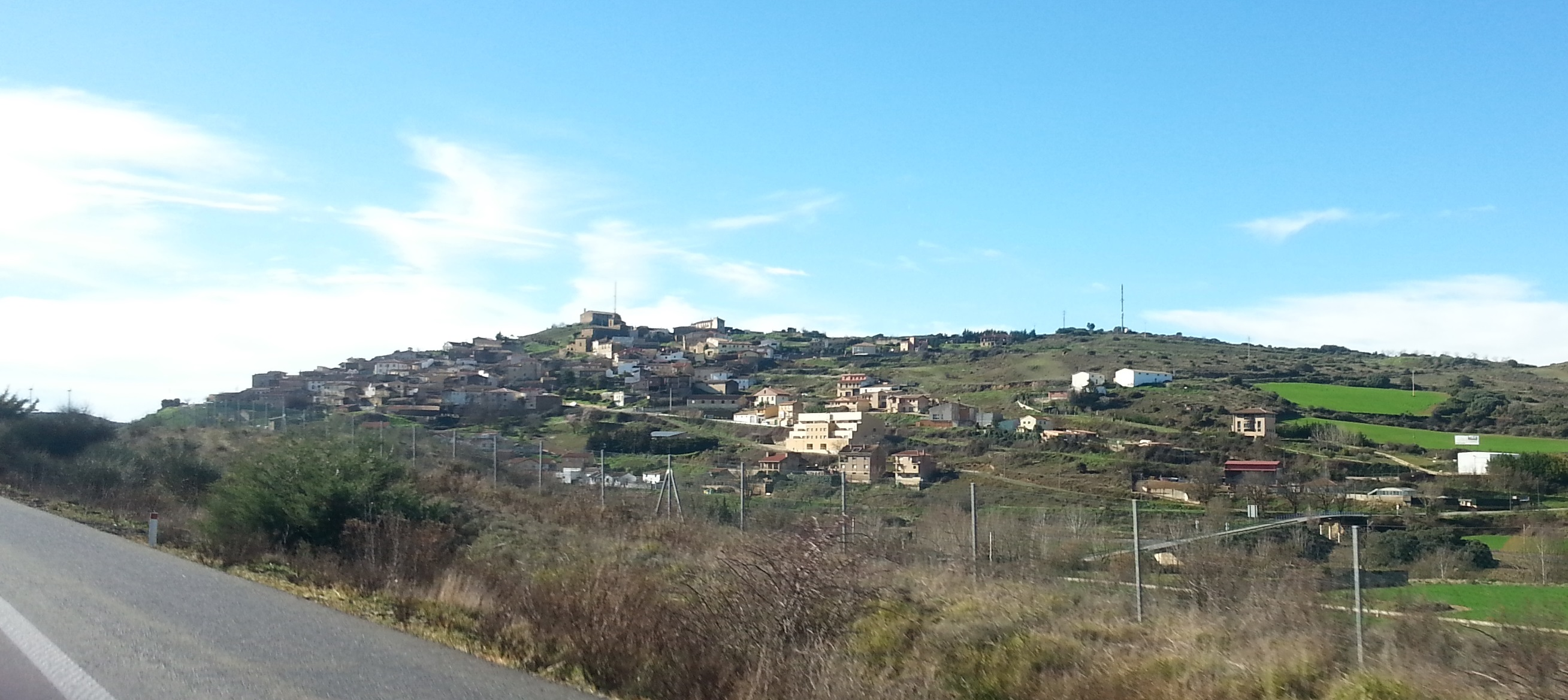

Pueyo is a town located in the province and autonomous community of Navarre, northern Spain.
