= Artazu =

Municipality of Spain

Coordinates: 42°41.492′N 1°50.289′W

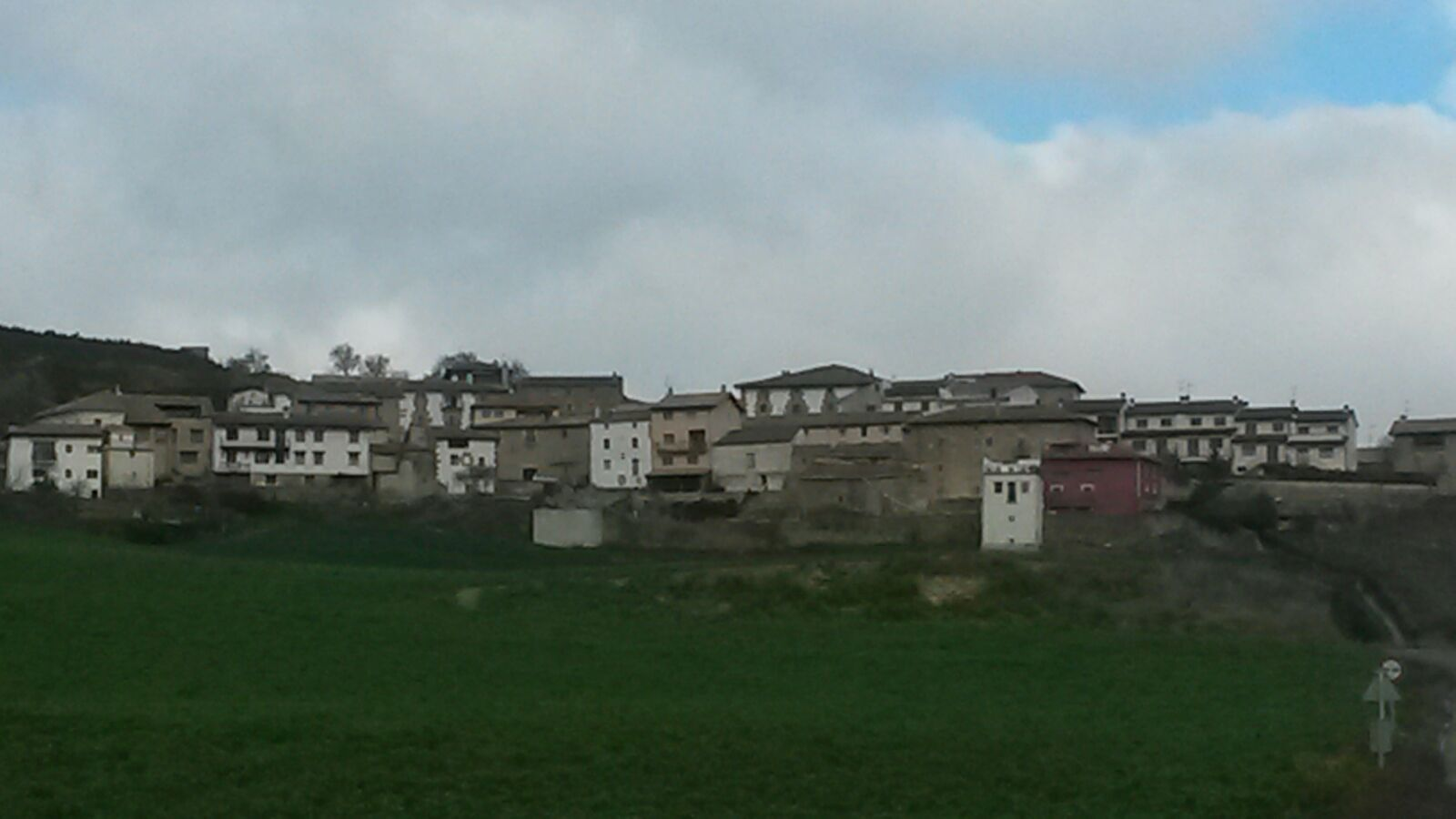
Panoramic view of Artazu, Navarra

Artazu's flag

Artazu's coat of arms

Artazu is a town and municipality located in the province and autonomous community of Navarre, northern Spain.
