= Biurrun-Olcoz =

Municipality of Spain

Coordinates: 42°41′42″N 1°40′46″W

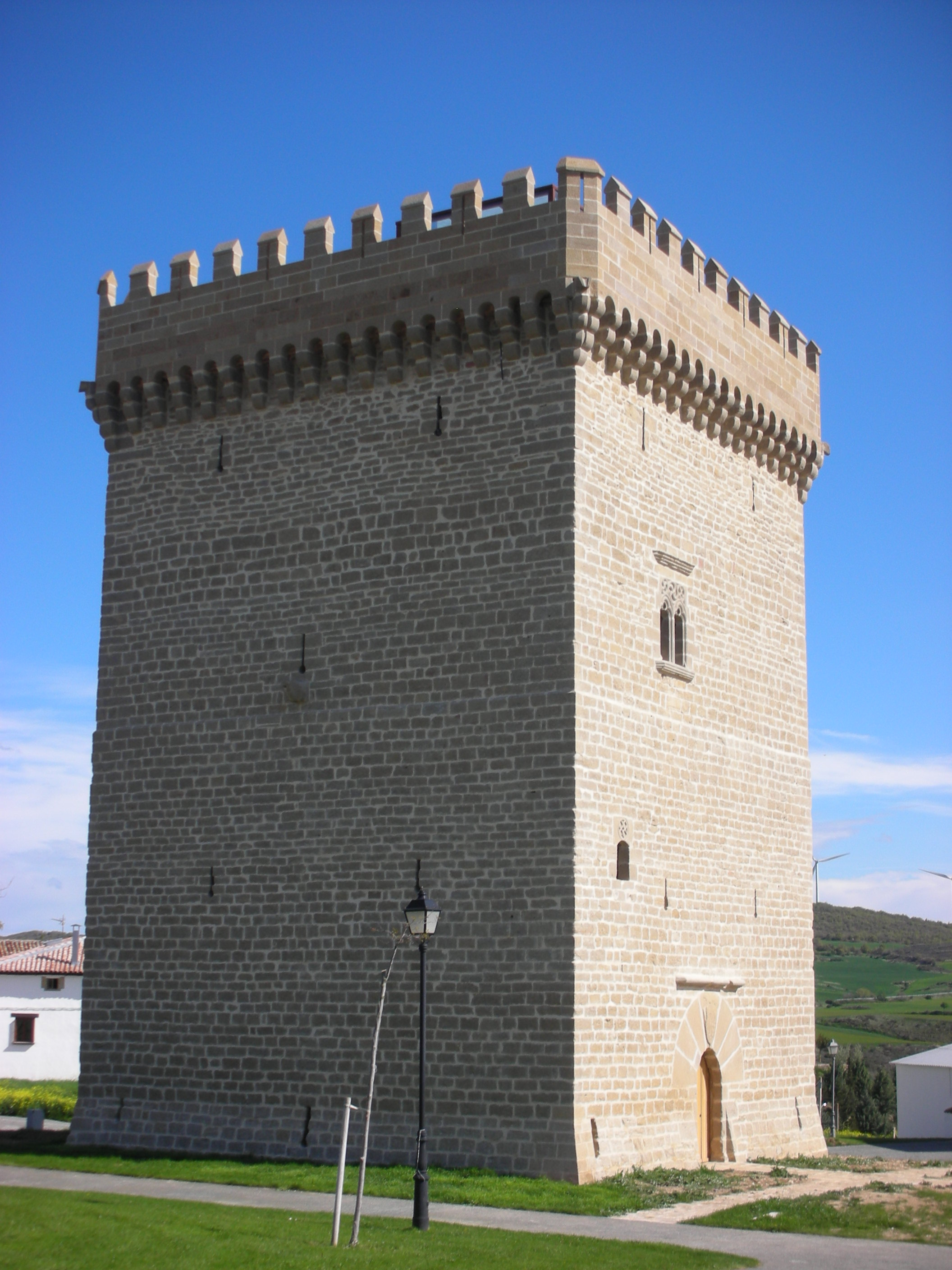
Medieval tower at Biurrun-Olcoz, Navarra, Spain

Biurrun-Olcoz's flag

Biurrun-Olcoz's coat of arms

Biurrun-Olcoz is a town and municipality located in the province and autonomous community of Navarre, northern Spain.
