= Saldías, Navarre =

Human settlement in Spain

Coordinates: 43°05′N 1°46′W

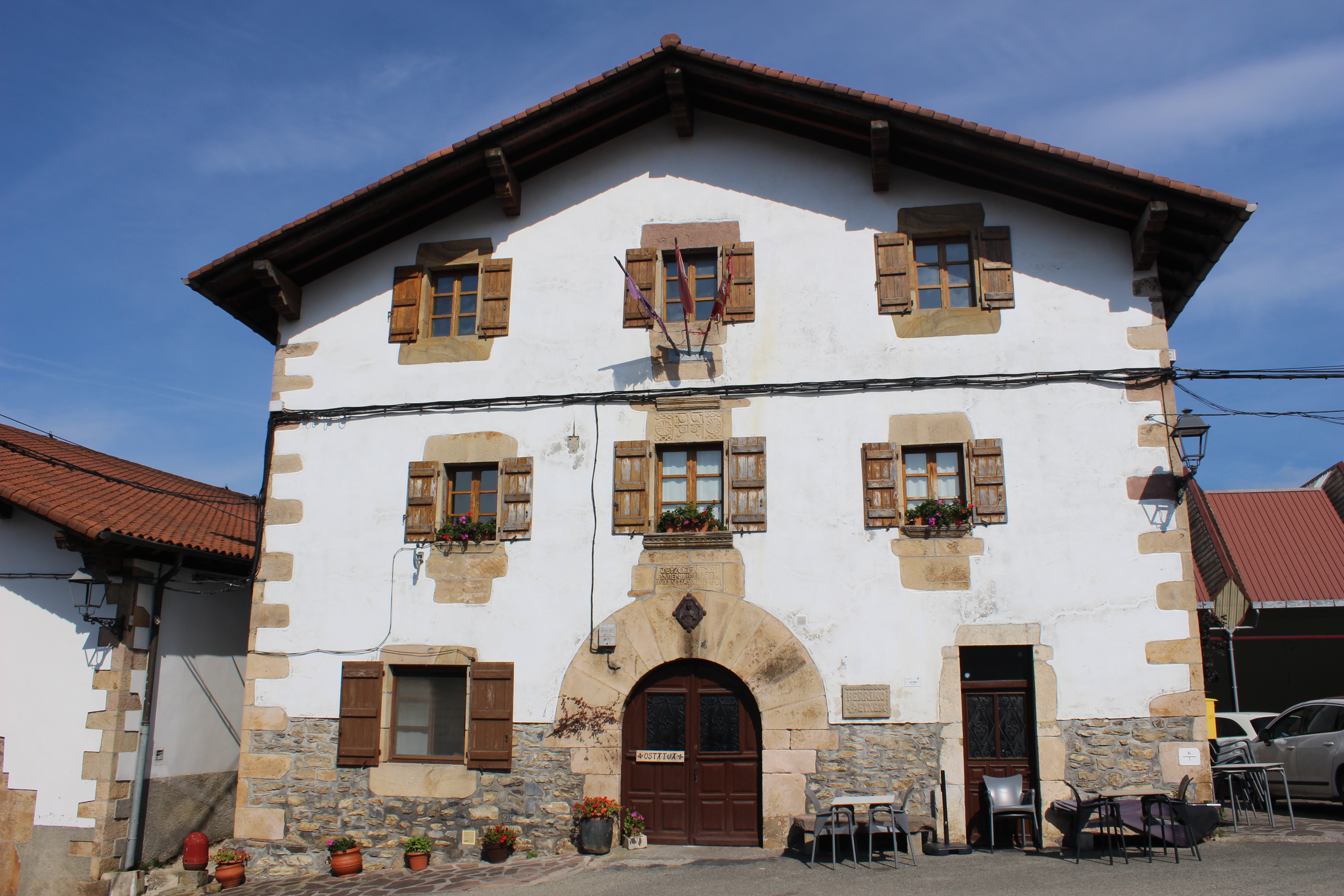
Town hall

Saldías is a town and municipality located in the province and autonomous community of Navarre, northern Spain.
