= Unzué =

Municipality of Spain

Coordinates: 42°39′7″N 1°37′34″W

Municipality of Unzué in Navarre

Unzué is a town and municipality located in the province of Navarre, in the autonomous community of Navarre, in the North of Spain.
