= Lacunza =

Lacunza is a surname. Notable people with the surname include:

- Benita Galeana Lacunza (1903–1995), Mexican writer, suffragist, unionist, and activist
- Hernán Lacunza (born 1969), Argentine economist
- Izaskun Lacunza, Spanish scientist
- José Luis Lacunza Maestrojuán (born 1944), Spanish-born Panamanian Catholic bishop
- Leandro Lacunza (born 1997), Argentine footballer
- Manuel Lacunza (1731–c. 1801), Chilean Jesuit priest
- María Lacunza Ezcurra (1900–1984), Spanish lawyer and politician
- Natalia Lacunza (born 1999), Spanish singer-songwriter
