= List of municipalities in Navarre =

Map of Spain with the province of Navarre highlighted

This is a list of the municipalities in the province and autonomous community of Navarre, Spain.

Name	Population (2025)
Abaigar	74
Abarzuza	510
Abaurregaina/Abaurrea Alta	121
Abaurrepea/Abaurrea Baja	30
Aberin	410
Ablitas	2,657
Adios	194
Aguilar de Codés	74
Aibar/Oibar	754
Altsasu/Alsasua	7,717
Allin	881
Allo	1,028
Améscoa Baja	729
Ancín	363
Andosilla	2,925
Ansoáin	10,663
Anue	501
Añorbe	622
Agoitz	3,093
Araitz	506
Arakil	990
Aranarache	70
Aranguren	13,216
Arano	108
Arantza	628
Aras	150
Arbizu	1,107
Arce	290
Los Arcos	1,177
Arellano	165
Areso	260
Arguedas	2,309
Aria	51
Aribe	34
Armañanzas	47
Arróniz	1,064
Arruazu	121
Artajona	1,783
Artazu	125
Atez	227
Auritz / Burguete	235
Ayegui	2,589
Azagra	3,746
Azuelo	29
Bakaiku	342
Barañáin	19,642
Barásoain	601
Barbarin	46
Bargota	237
Barillas	240
Basaburua	819
Baztan	7,851
Beintza-Labaien	228
Beire	274
Belascoáin	124
Bera	3,779
Berbinzana	670
Beriáin	4,195
Berrioplano	7,645
Berriozar	11,361
Bertizarana	668
Betelu	375
Bidaurreta	181
Biurrun-Olcoz	227
Buñuel	2,318
Burgui-Burgi	187
Burlada	21,280
El Busto	55
Cabanillas	1,373
Cabredo	73
Cadreita	2,187
Caparroso	2,882
Cárcar	1,156
Carcastillo	2,408
Cascante	4,231
Cáseda	912
Castejón	4,725
Castillonuevo	14
Cintruénigo	8,565
Cirauqui	473
Ciriza	170
Cizur	3,949
Corella	8,756
Cortes	3,165
Desojo	68
Dicastillo	562
Donamaria	446
Doneztebe/Santesteban	1,854
Echarri/Etxarri	78
Eguesibar	22,825
Elgorriaga	210
Enériz	328
Eratsun	155
Ergoiena	392
Erro	812
Eslava	97
Esparza de Salazar	75
Espronceda	102
Estella-Lizarra	14,317
Esteribar	2,918
Etayo	72
Etxalar	807
Etxarri-Aranatz	2,551
Etxauri	671
Eulate	278
Ezcabarte	1,901
Ezcároz - Ezkaroze	298
Ezkurra	125
Ezprogui	48
Falces	2,389
Fitero	2,370
Fontellas	1,050
Funes	2,537
Fustiñana	2,445
Galar	2,427
Gallipienzo	100
Gallués - Galoze	91
Garaioa	92
Garde	133
Garínoain	527
Garralda	183
Genevilla	69
Goizueta	681
Goñi	166
Güesa - Gorza	36
Guesálaz	462
Guirguillano	75
Hiriberri/Villanueva de Aezkoa	96
Huarte - Uharte	7,900
Ibargoiti	279
Igantzi	578
Igúzquiza	307
Imotz	433
Irañeta	172
Irurtzun	2,296
Isaba/Izaba	384
Ituren	543
Iturmendi	428
Iza	1459
Izagaondoa	153
Izalzu - Itzaltzu	36
Jaurrieta	179
Juslapeña	562
Lakuntza	1,338
Lana	149
Lantz	159
Lapoblación	123
Larraga	2,158
Larraona	100
Larraun	918
Lazagurría	170
Leache	38
Legarda	143
Legaria	111
Leitza	3,011
Lekunberri	1,746
Leoz	202
Lerga	44
Lerín	1,821
Lesaka	2,721
Lezáun	248
Liédena	354
Lizoáin-Arriasgoiti	287
Lodosa	4,964
Lónguida - Longida	308
Lumbier	1,330
Luquin	135
Luzaide/Valcarlos	336
Mañeru	452
Marañón	50
Marcilla	2,938
Mélida	739
Mendavia	3,588
Mendaza	284
Mendigorría	1,261
Metauten	263
Milagro	3,741
Mirafuentes	56
Miranda de Arga	903
Monreal	511
Monteagudo	1,073
Morentin	110
Mues	80
Murchante	4,230
Murieta	345
Murillo El Cuende	701
Murillo El Fruto	665
Muruzábal	283
Navascués	114
Nazar	40
Noáin (Valle de Elorz)-Noain (Elortzibar)	8,486
Obanos	924
Oco	65
Ochagavía/Otsagabia	492
Odieta	367
Oitz	129
Olaibar	399
Olazti/Olazagutía	1,444
Olejua	49
Olite	4,069
Olóriz	210
Olza	1,874
Ollo	453
Orbaitzeta	186
Orbara	28
Orcoyen	4,098
Orísoain	72
Oronz	51
Oroz-Betelu	143
Orreaga/Roncesvalles	25
Oteiza	972
Pamplona/Iruña	209,094
Peralta	6,071
Petilla de Aragón	29
Piedramillera	46
Pitillas	520
Puente la Reina/Gares	2,972
Pueyo	384
Ribaforada	3,697
Romanzado	180
Roncal – Erronkari	206
Sada	130
Saldías	125
Salinas de Oro	110
San Adrián	6,504
San Martín de Unx	352
Sangüesa/Zangoza	4,883
Sansol	89
Santacara	874
Sarriés - Sartze	57
Sartaguda	1,349
Sesma	1,248
Sorlada	39
Sunbilla	672
Tafalla	10,854
Tiebas-Muruarte de Reta	693
Tirapu	49
Torralba del Río	96
Torres del Río	116
Tudela	38,903
Tulebras	159
Úcar	194
Uharte-Arakil	770
Ujué	168
Ultzama	1,599
Unciti	257
Unzué	164
Urdazubi/Urdax	354
Urdiain	647
Urraúl Alto	136
Urraúl Bajo	330
Urrotz	175
Urroz	403
Urzainki	76
Uterga	177
Uztárroz - Uztarrotze	136
Valtierra	1,505
Viana	4,441
Vidángoz - Bidankoze	74
Villafranca	3,163
Villamayor de Monjardín	115
Villatuerta	1,265
Villava/Atarrabia	9,928
Javier	106
Yerri	1,549
Yesa	297
Zabalza	285
Ziordia	359
Zizur Mayor/Zizur Nagusia	16,510
Zubieta	292
Zugarramurdi	213
Zúñiga	78

== See also ==
- Geography of Spain
- List of cities in Spain
