= Ultzamaldea =

Coordinates: 42°56′59″N 1°40′31″W

- Eskualdea / Comarca
- Country: Spain
- Autonomous community: Navarre
- Municipalities: List: See text

Population (2019)
  - Total: 6,300
- Time zone: UTC+1 (CET)
  - Summer (DST): UTC+2 (CEST)

Ultzamaldea is a comarca in Navarre, Spain.

== Municipalities ==
The comarca consists of nine municipalities, with the largest being the municipalities of Ezcabarte and Ultzama. They are listed below with their populations at recent censuses, together with the most recent official estimate:

Name	Population Census 2001	Population Census 2011	Population Estimate 2019
Anue	410	436	482
Atez	232	245	215
Basaburua	674	870	834
Ezcabarte	1,261	1,686	1,805
Imotz	407	431	423
Lantz	121	133	148
Odieta	318	359	362
Oláibar	161	251	378
Ultzama	1,587	1,705	1,653
Totals	5,171	6,116	6,300

== See also ==
- Category:People from Ultzamaldea
