= Oláibar =

Oláibar Olaibar
- Municipality
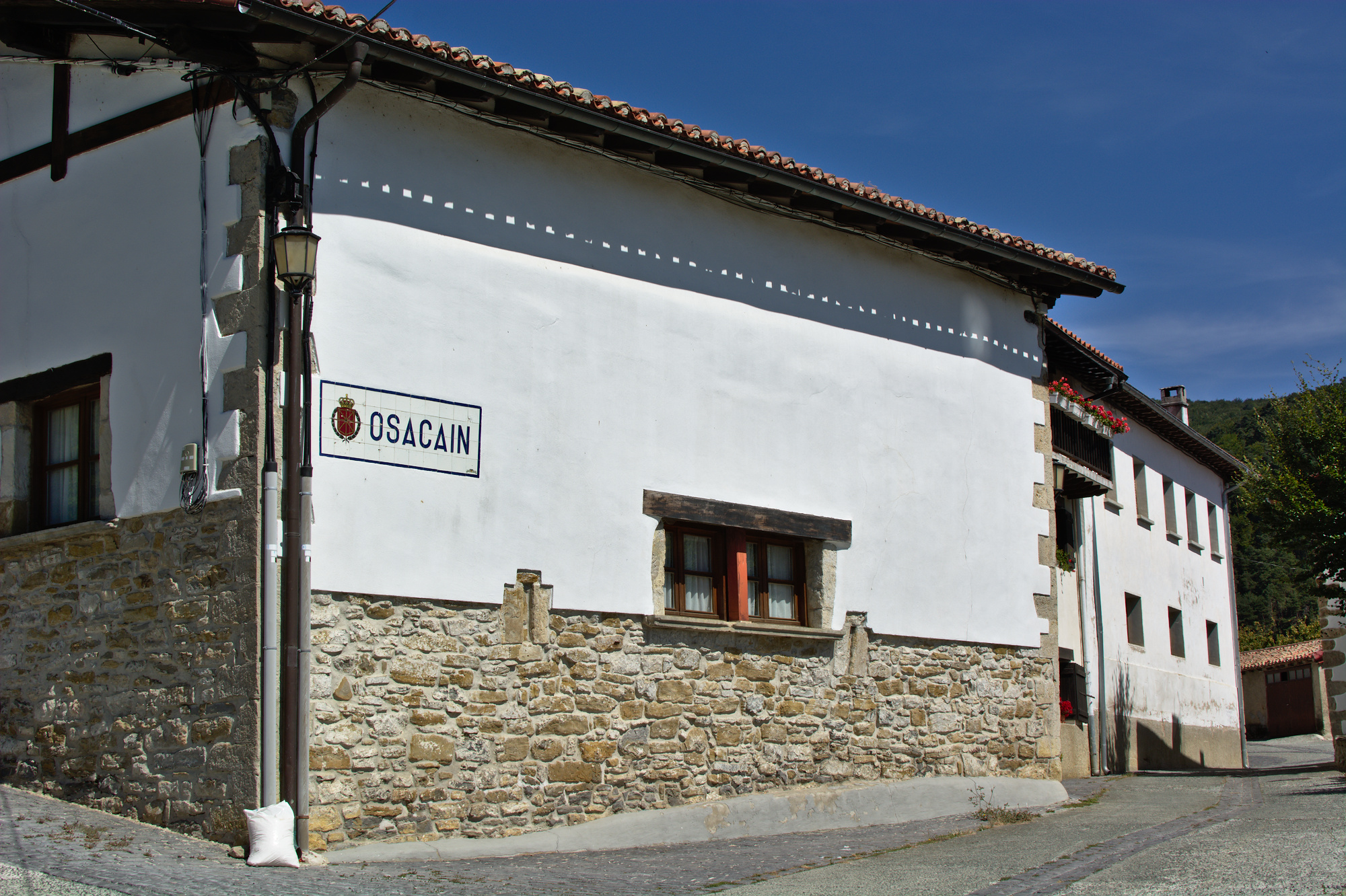
- The town hall at Osacáin

- Coat of arms

- Location in Navarre Oláibar (Spain)
- Coordinates: 42°53′09″N 1°36′10″W
- Country: Spain
- Community: Navarre
- Province: Navarre
- Comarca: Ultzamaldea

Government
  - Mayor: María del Carmen Lizoáin Osinaga

Area
  - Total: 15.72 km^{2} (6.07 sq mi)
- Elevation: 470 m (1,540 ft)

Population (2025-01-01)
  - Total: 399
  - Density: 25.4/km^{2} (65.7/sq mi)
- Postal code: 31789
- Website: Official website

Oláibar (Basque: Olaibar) is a town and municipality located in the province and autonomous community of Navarre, northern Spain. In 2016, it had a population of 334.

== Geography ==
The municipality borders with Anue, Esteribar, Ezcabarte and Odieta. It is composed by 7 settlements: the villages and councils (concejos) of Endériz, Olaiz, Olave and Osacáin; and the localities (lugares) of Beraiz, Osavide and Zandio.

== Demographics ==
Demographic evolution
