= Ekai =

Ekai may refer to:

- Ekai language, a language of Myanmar
- Ekai Kawaguchi, Japanese monk
- Ekai, Longida, a settlement in Longida, Spain
- Ekai, Arakil, a settlement in Arakil, Spain

== See also ==
- ECAI (disambiguation)
