= Urrotz =

Municipality in Navarre, Spain

Coordinates: 43.101°N 1.706°W

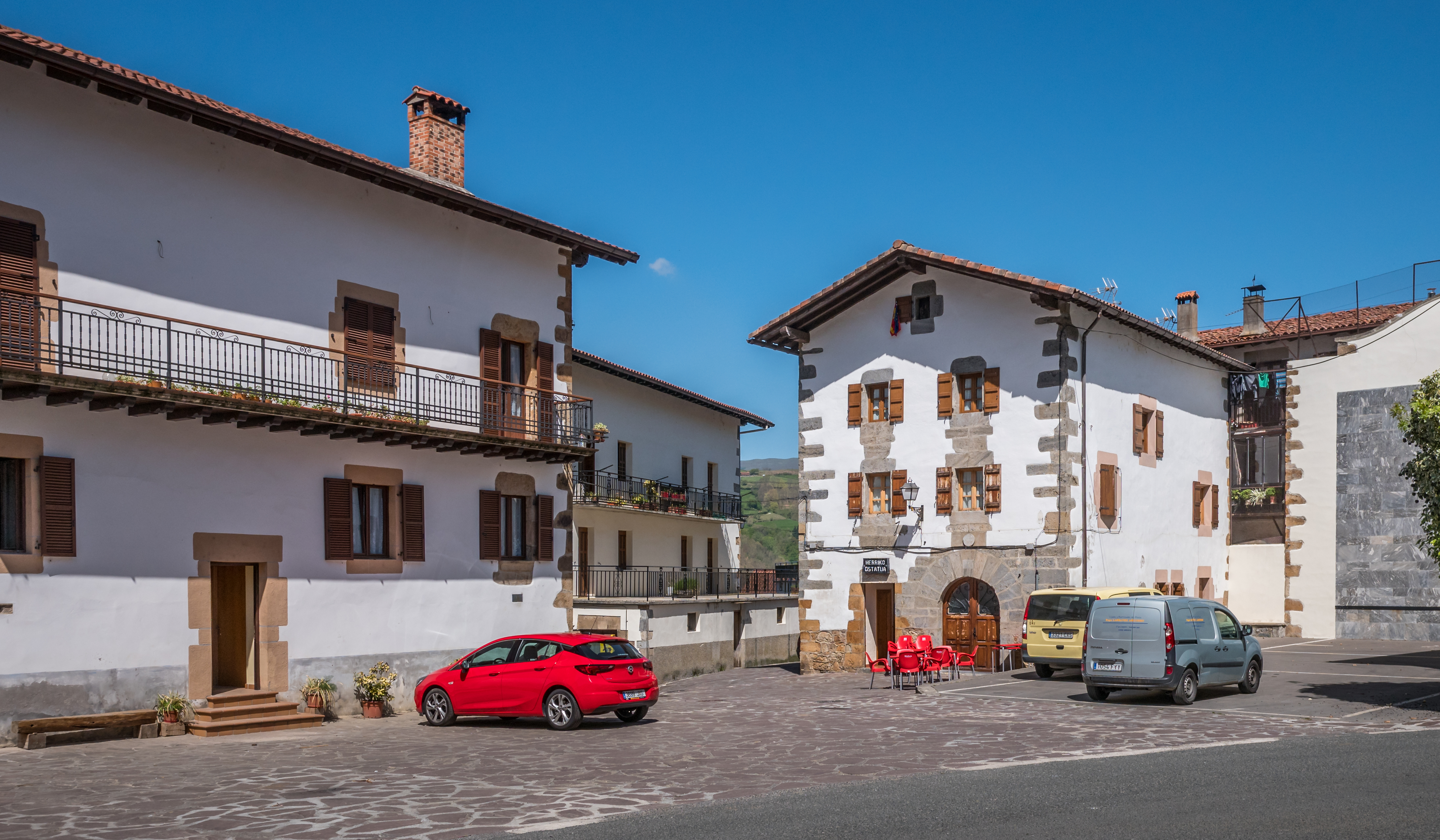
View of Urroz

Urrotz is a town and municipality located in the province of Navarre, in the autonomous community of Navarre, northern Spain.
