= Pitillas =

Town in Navarre, Spain

Coordinates: 42°25′N 1°37′W

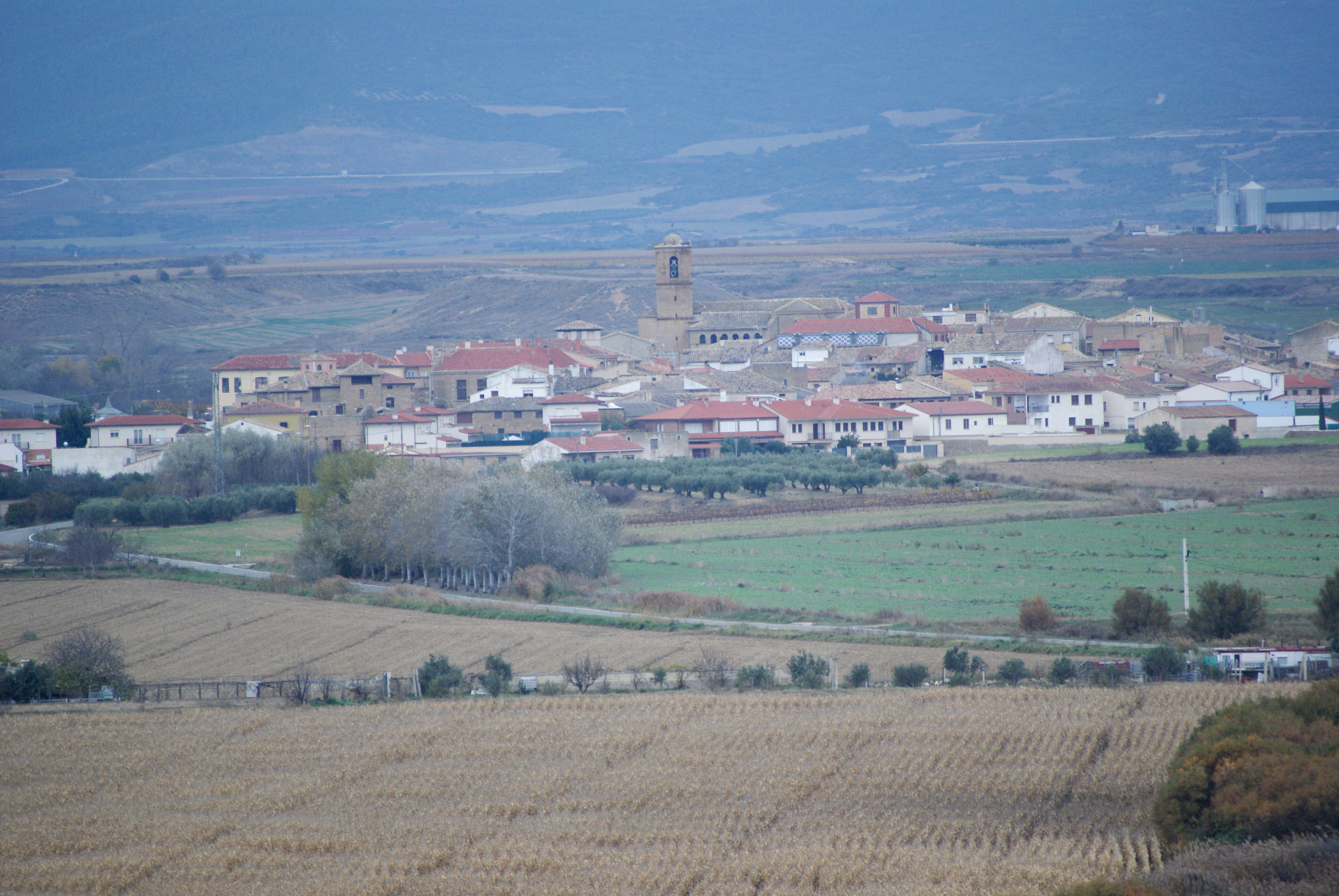

Pitillas is a town located in the province and autonomous community of Navarre, northern Spain.
