= Murillo El Cuende =

Municipality of Spain

Coordinates: 42°24′N 1°38′W

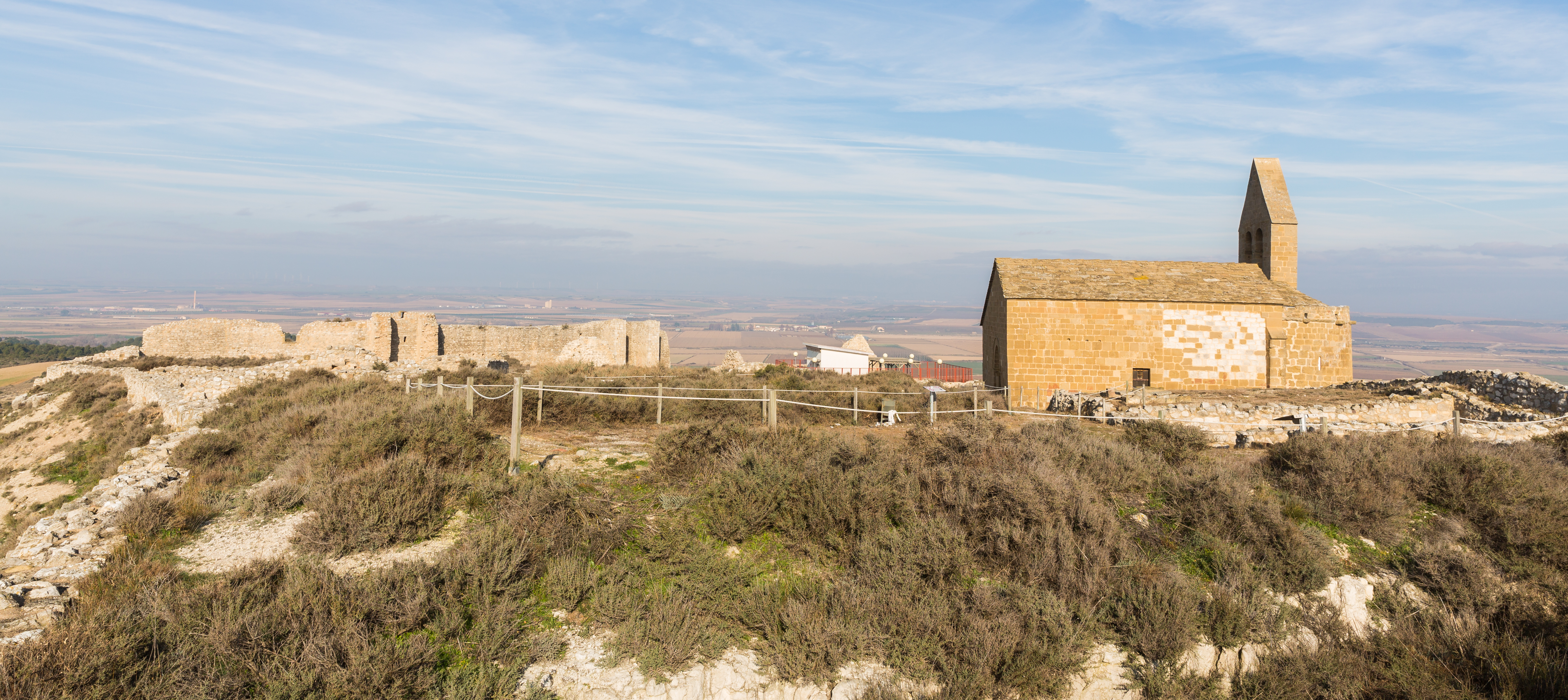

Murillo El Cuende is a town and municipality located in the province and autonomous community of Navarre, northern Spain.
