= Orísoain =

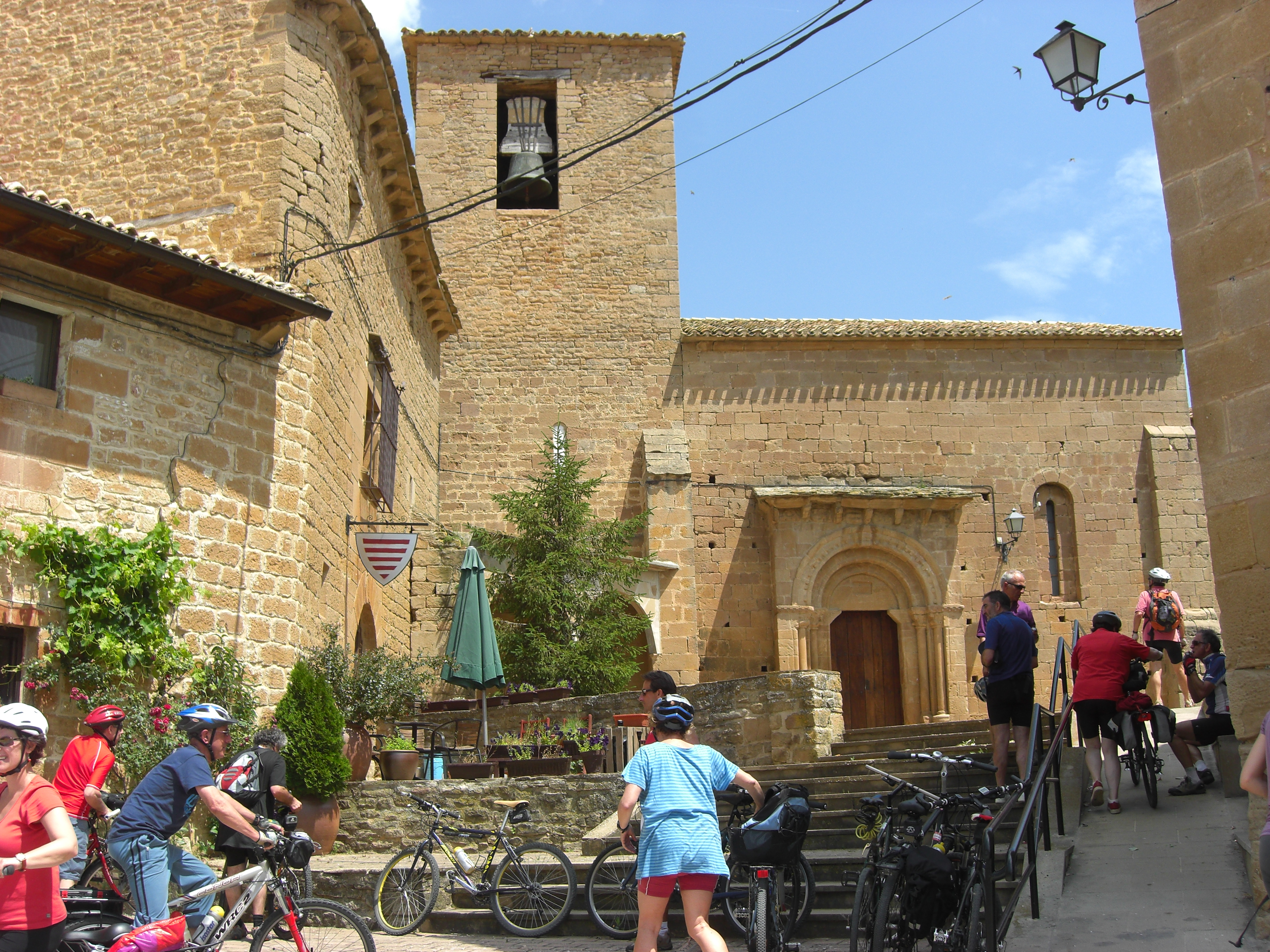

- Coat of arms

- Location of Orísoain within Navarre Location of Orísoain within Spain
- Coordinates: 42°36′N 1°36′W
- Country: Spain
- Autonomous community: Navarra

Government
  - Mayor: Alexandre Duró Cazorla

Area
  - Total: 7 km^{2} (2.7 sq mi)
- Elevation: 581 m (1,906 ft)

Population (2025-01-01)
  - Total: 72
  - Density: 10/km^{2} (27/sq mi)
- Time zone: UTC+1 (CET)
  - Summer (DST): UTC+2 (CEST)

Orisoain is a town and municipality located in the province and autonomous community of Navarre, northern Spain.
