= Beintza-Labaien =

Municipality of Spain

Coordinates: 43°5′14″N 1°44′20″W

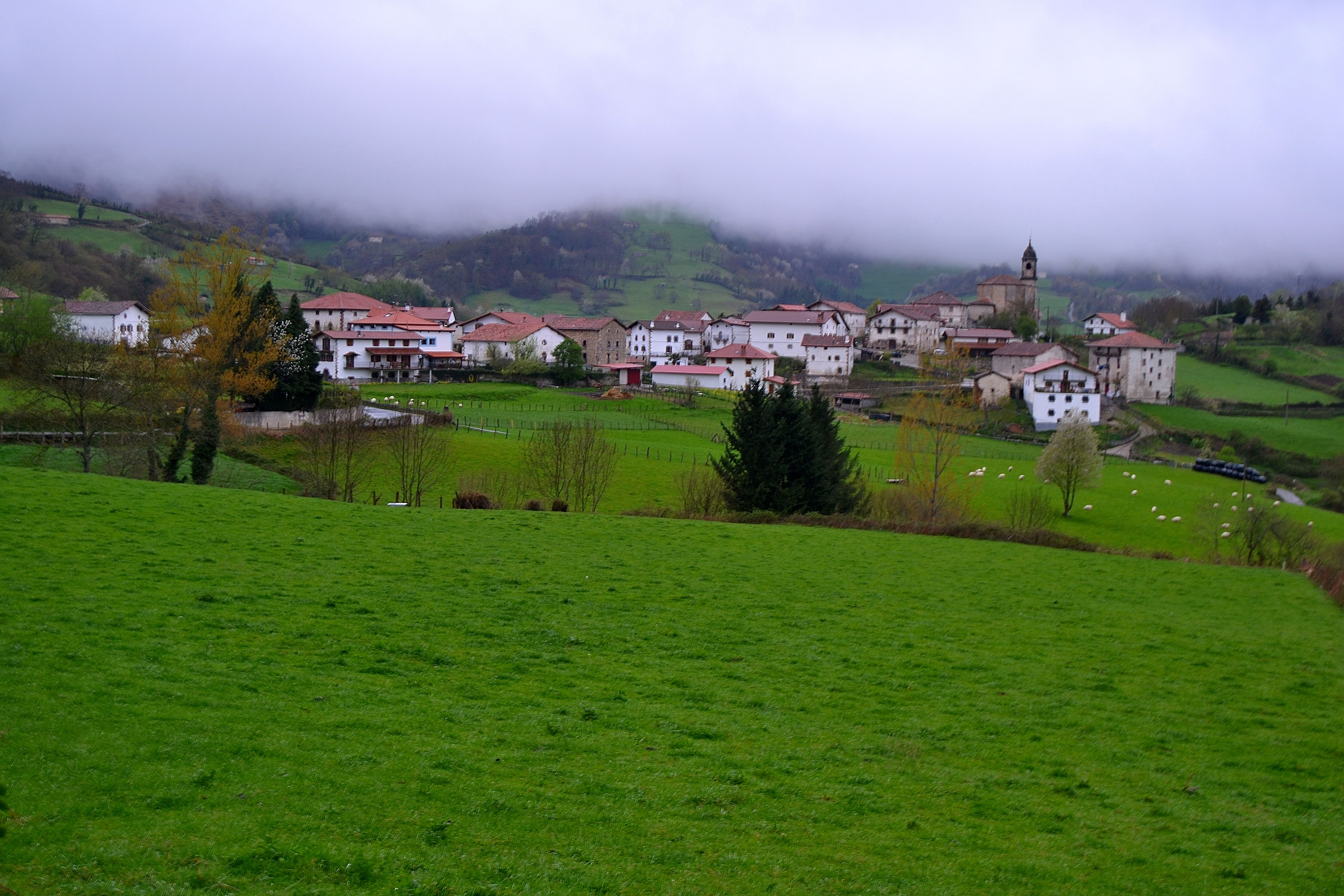
Beintza-Labaien

Beintza-Labaien's coat of arms

Beintza-Labaien is a municipality located in the province and autonomous community of Navarra, in northern Spain.
