= Lizoáin-Arriasgoiti =

Lizoáin-Arriasgoiti: Lizoainibar-Arriasgoiti (Basque) Lizoáin-Arriasgoiti (Spanish)
- Municipality
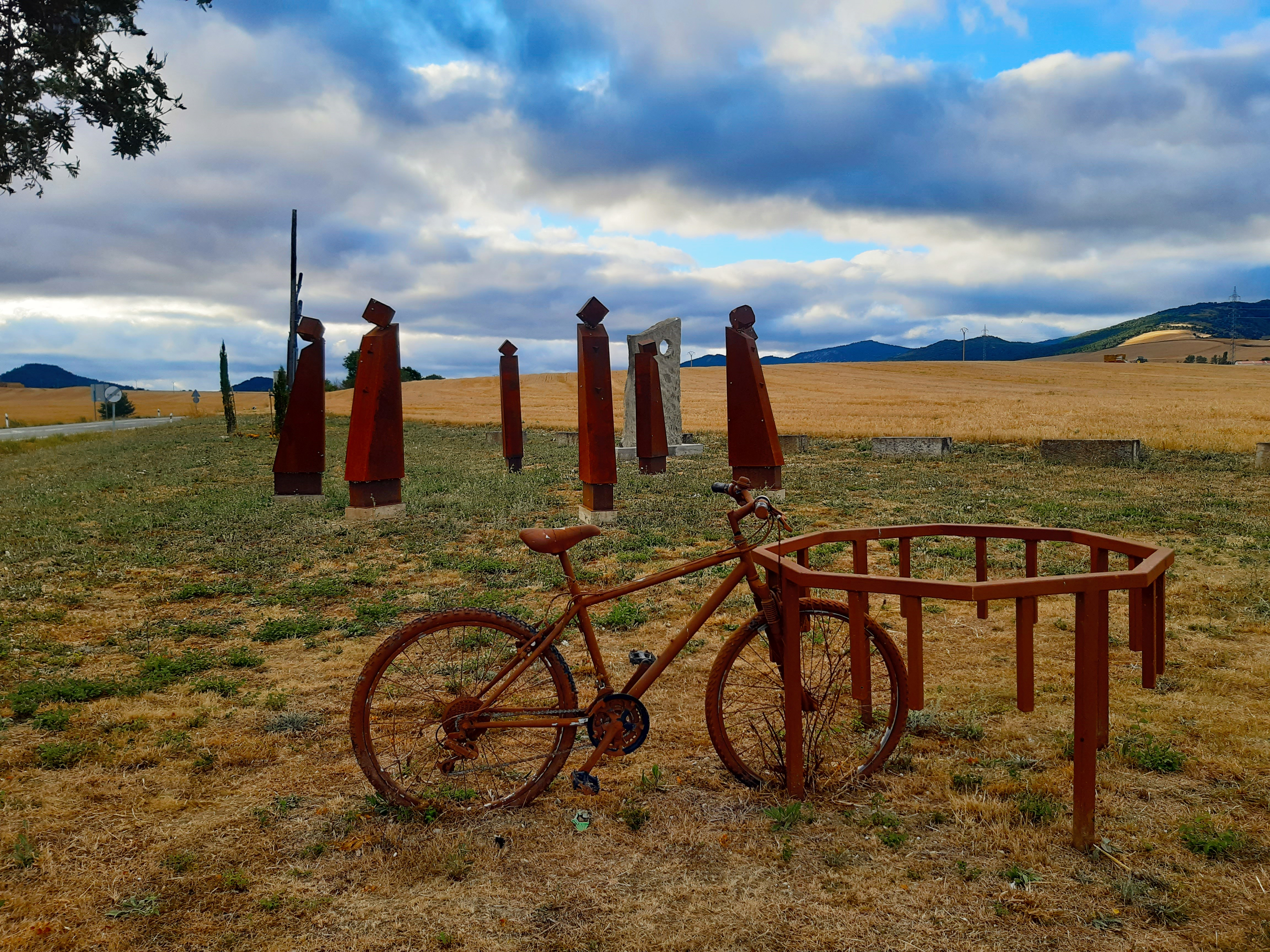
- A picture of a work at Lizoáin-Arriasgoiti which is dedicated to the victims of the 1936 coup.

- Coat of arms

- Location of Lizoáin-Arriasgoiti. Lizoáin-Arriasgoiti (Navarre)
- Coordinates: 42°49′48″N 1°27′48″W
- Country: Spain
- Autonomous community: Navarre
- Merindad: Merindad de Sangüesa
- Comarcas of Navarre: Prepirineo (until 2019, Aoiz)

Government
  - Mayor: Koldo Albira Sola (Ind.)

Area
  - Total: 65.53 km^{2} (25.30 sq mi)
- Elevation: 538 m (1,765 ft)

Population (2023)
  - Total: 303
  - Density: 4.62/km^{2} (12.0/sq mi)
- Time zone: UTC+1 (CET)
  - Summer (DST): UTC+2 (CEST)

Lizoainibar-Arriasgoiti (Basque) or Lizoáin-Arriasgoiti (Castilian) is a town and municipality located in the province and autonomous community of Navarre, northern Spain.
