= Gallipienzo =

Town and municipality of Spain

Coordinates: 42°31′N 1°24′W

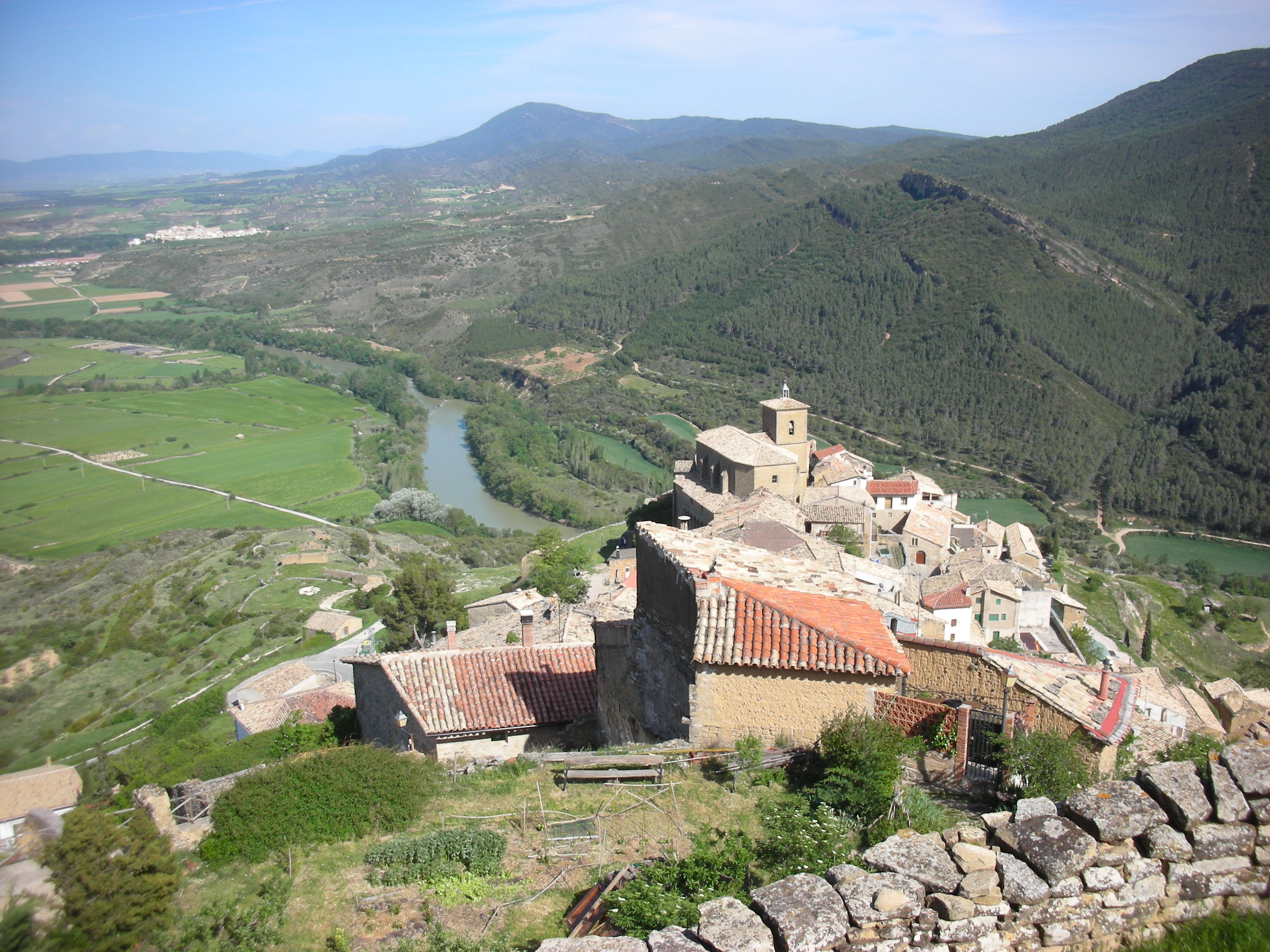
View of Gallipienzo from San Salvador

Gallipienzo (Basque: Galipentzu) is a town and municipality located in the province and autonomous community of Navarre, northern Spain. The village was used as a location in the Terry Gilliam movie 'The Man Who Killed Don Quixote'.
