= Ezprogui =

Municipality of Spain

Coordinates: 42°35′N 1°25′W

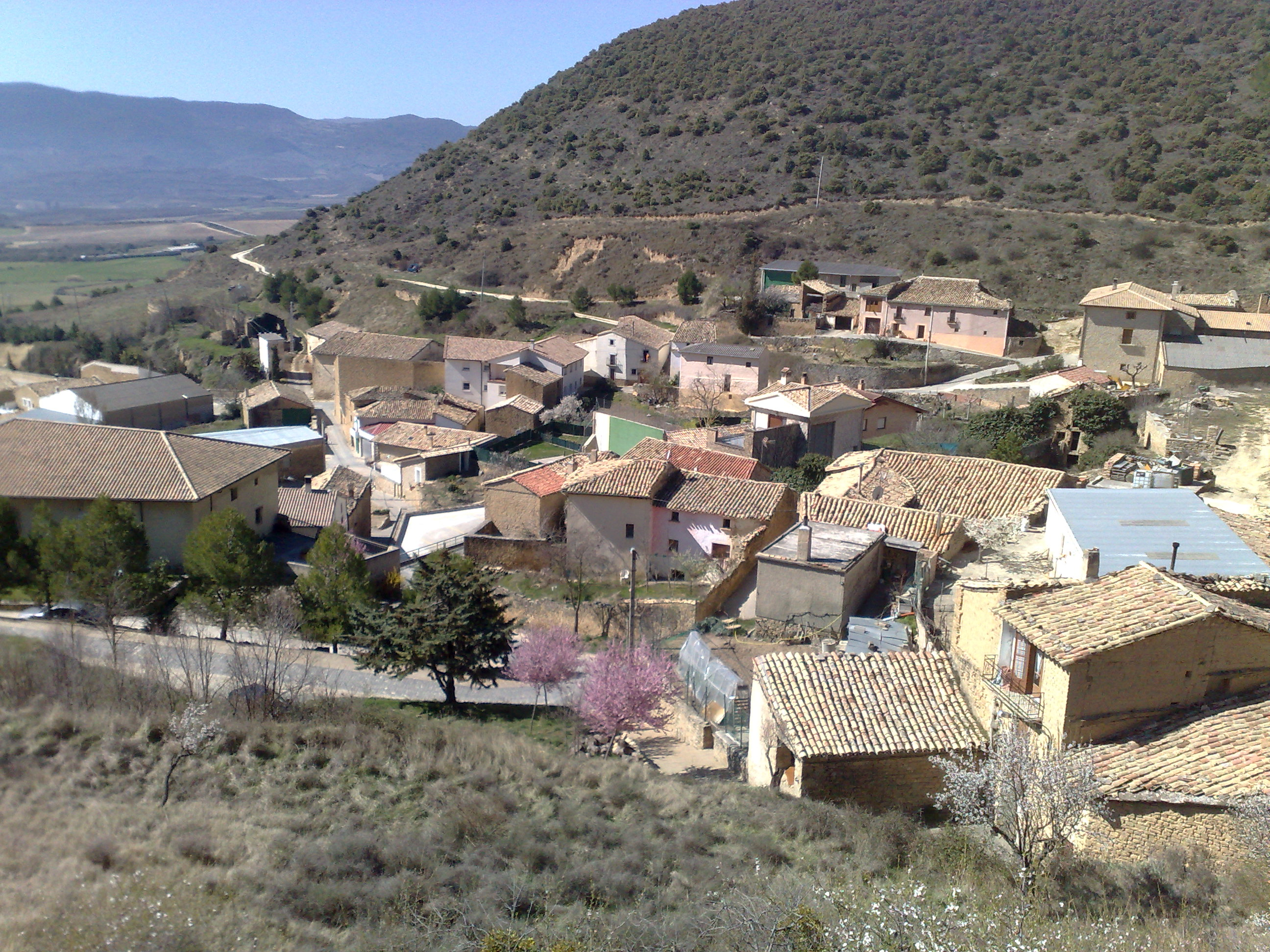
Ageza Village, part of Ezporogi municipality, Navarre, Basque Country

Ezprogui is a town and municipality located in the province and autonomous community of Navarra, northern Spain.
