= Sada, Navarre =

Municipality of Spain

Coordinates: 42.583°N 1.400°W

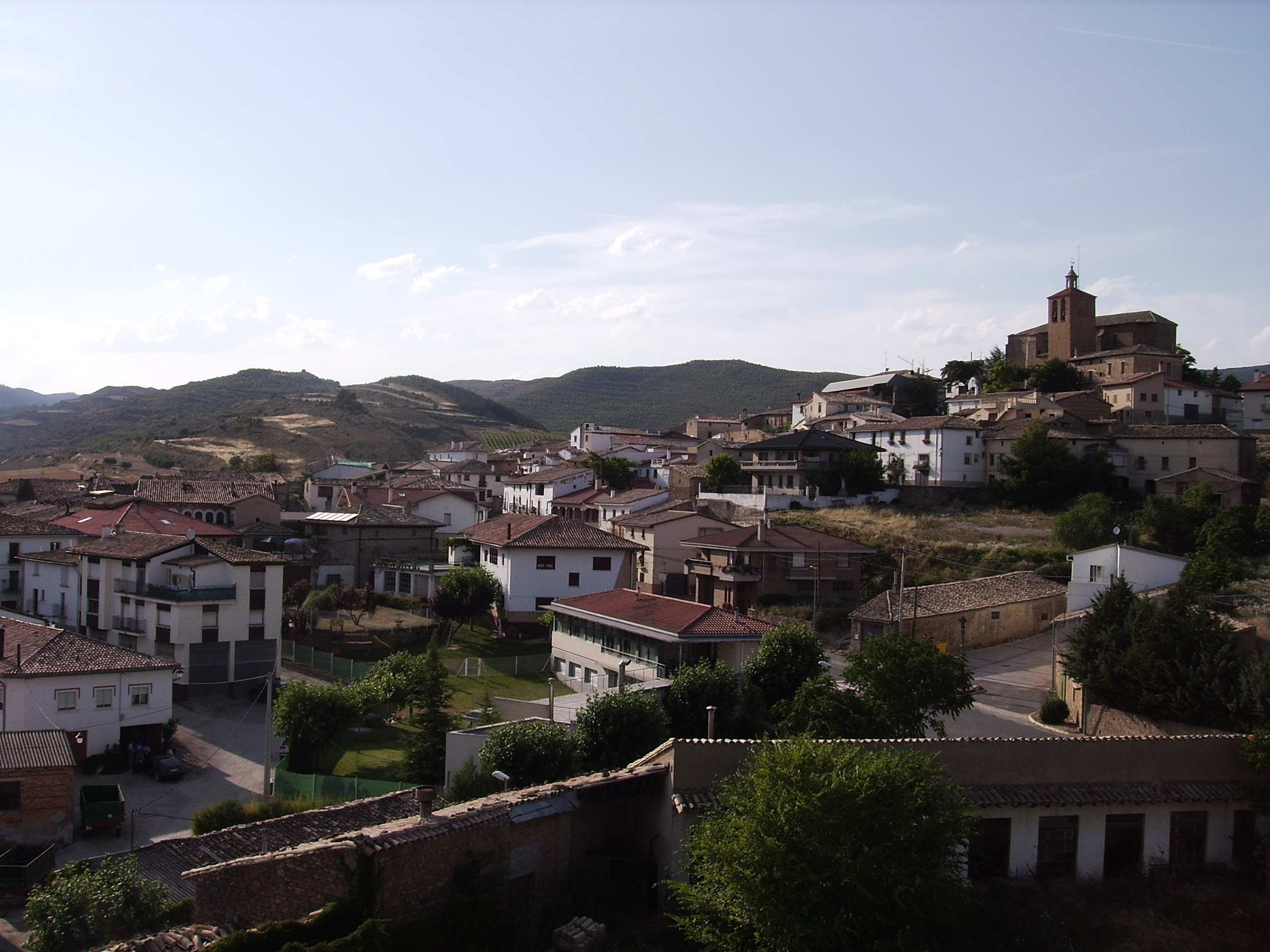

Sada is a town and municipality located in the province and autonomous community of Navarre, northern Spain.
