= Gallués – Galoze =

Town and municipality in northern Spain

Coordinates: 42.783°N 1.083°W

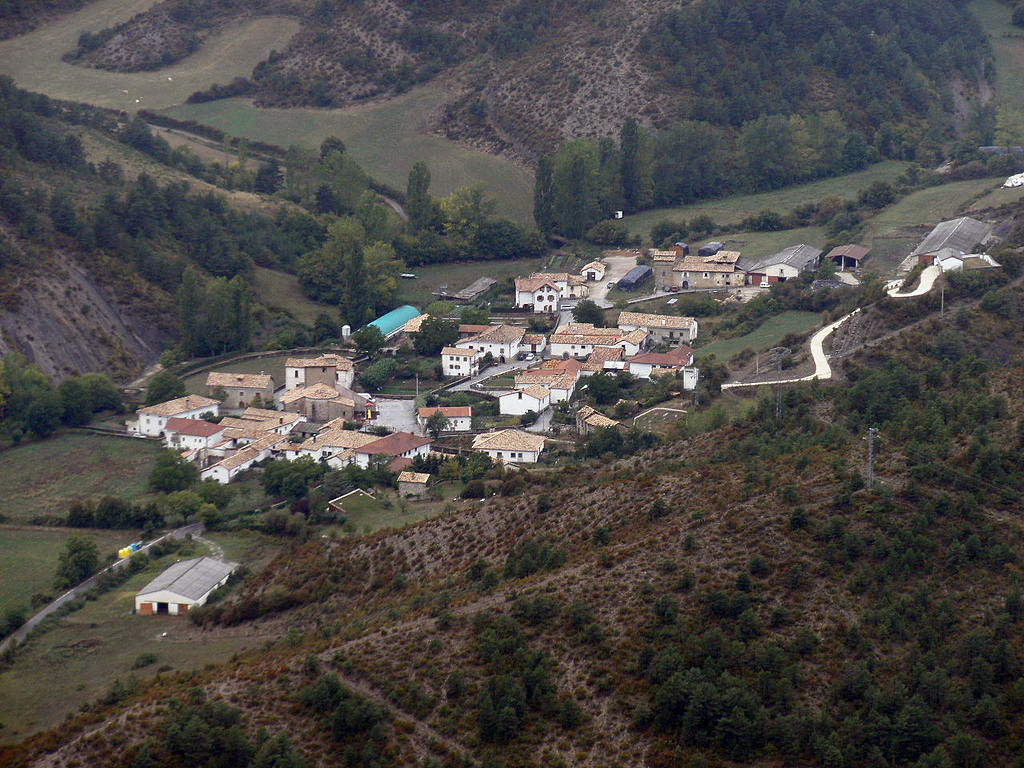

Gallués – Galoze is a town and municipality located in the province and autonomous community of Navarre, northern Spain.
