= ECAI =

ECAI may refer to:

- European Conference on Artificial Intelligence
- Electronic Cultural Atlas Initiative
- External Credit Assessment Institutions
- Elliptic Curve Artificial Intelligence
