= Oitz =

Municipality of Navarre, Spain

Coordinates: 43.111°N 1.686°W

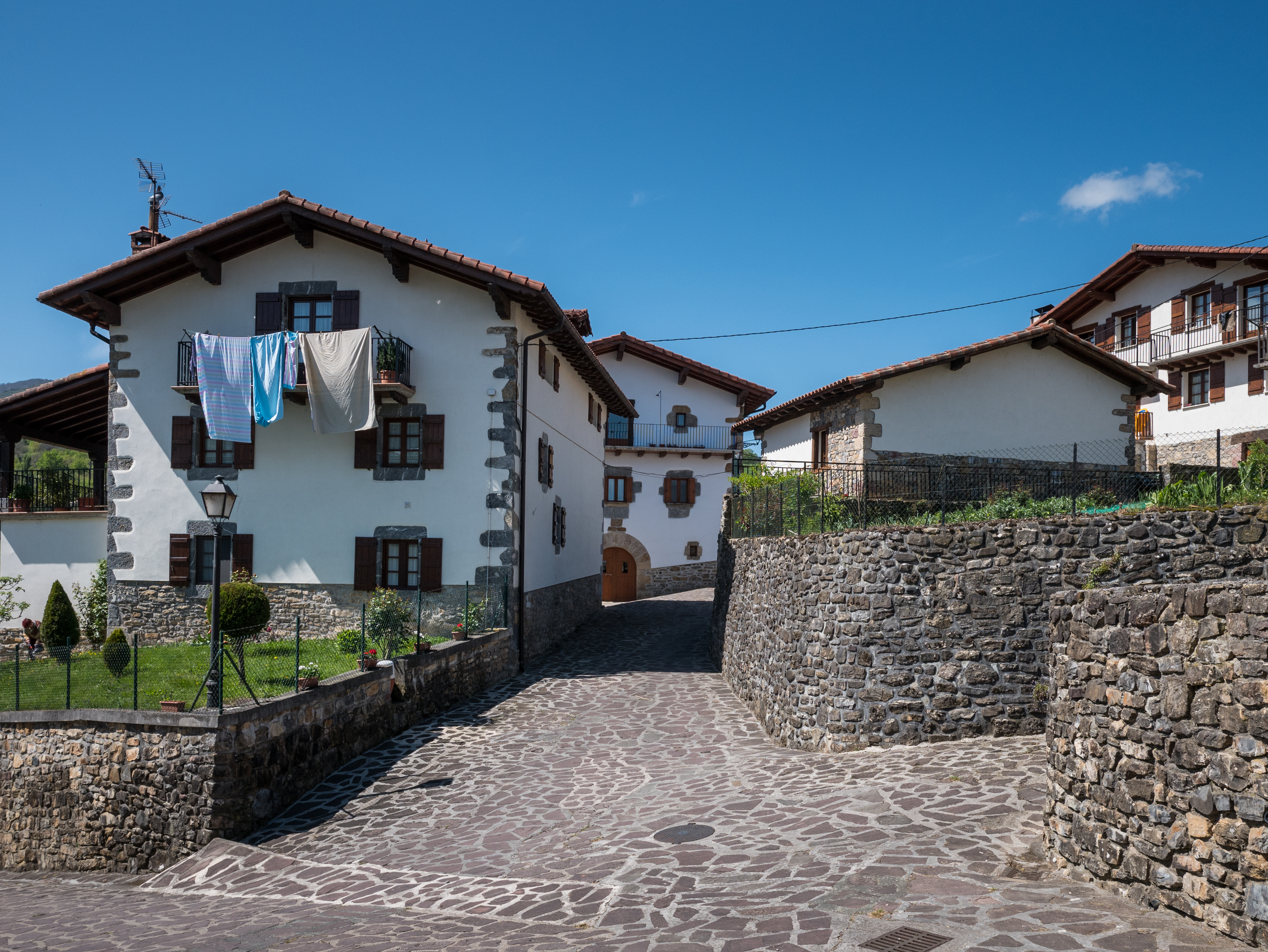
Street of Oitz

Oitz is a town and municipality located in the province and autonomous community of Navarre, northern Spain.
