= Sunbilla =

Town and municipality in Navarre, Spain

Coordinates: 43.164°N 1.668°W

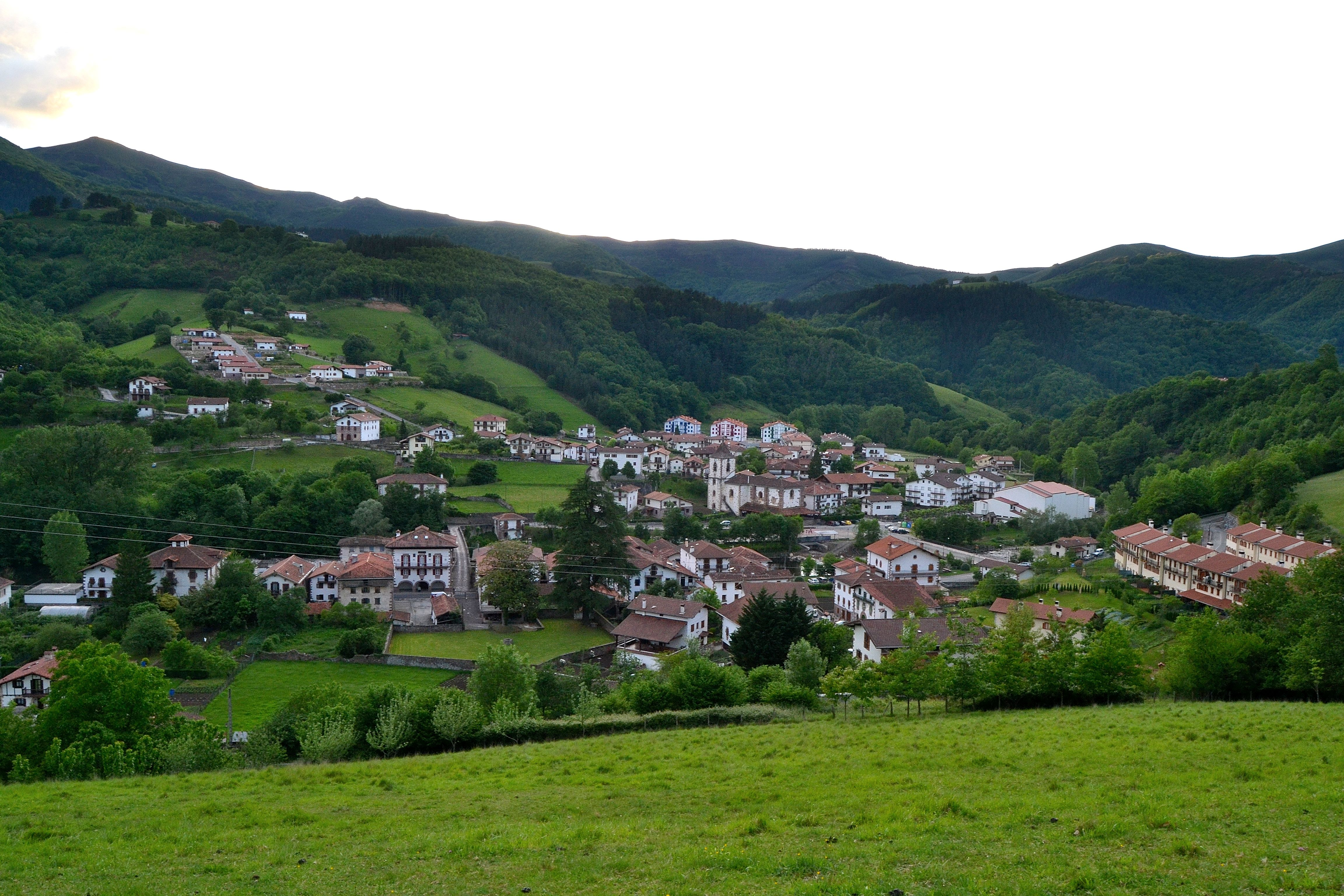
View of Sunbilla

Sunbilla is a town and municipality located in the province and autonomous community of Navarre, northern Spain.
