= Leache =

Municipality of Spain

Coordinates: 42°36′N 1°24′W

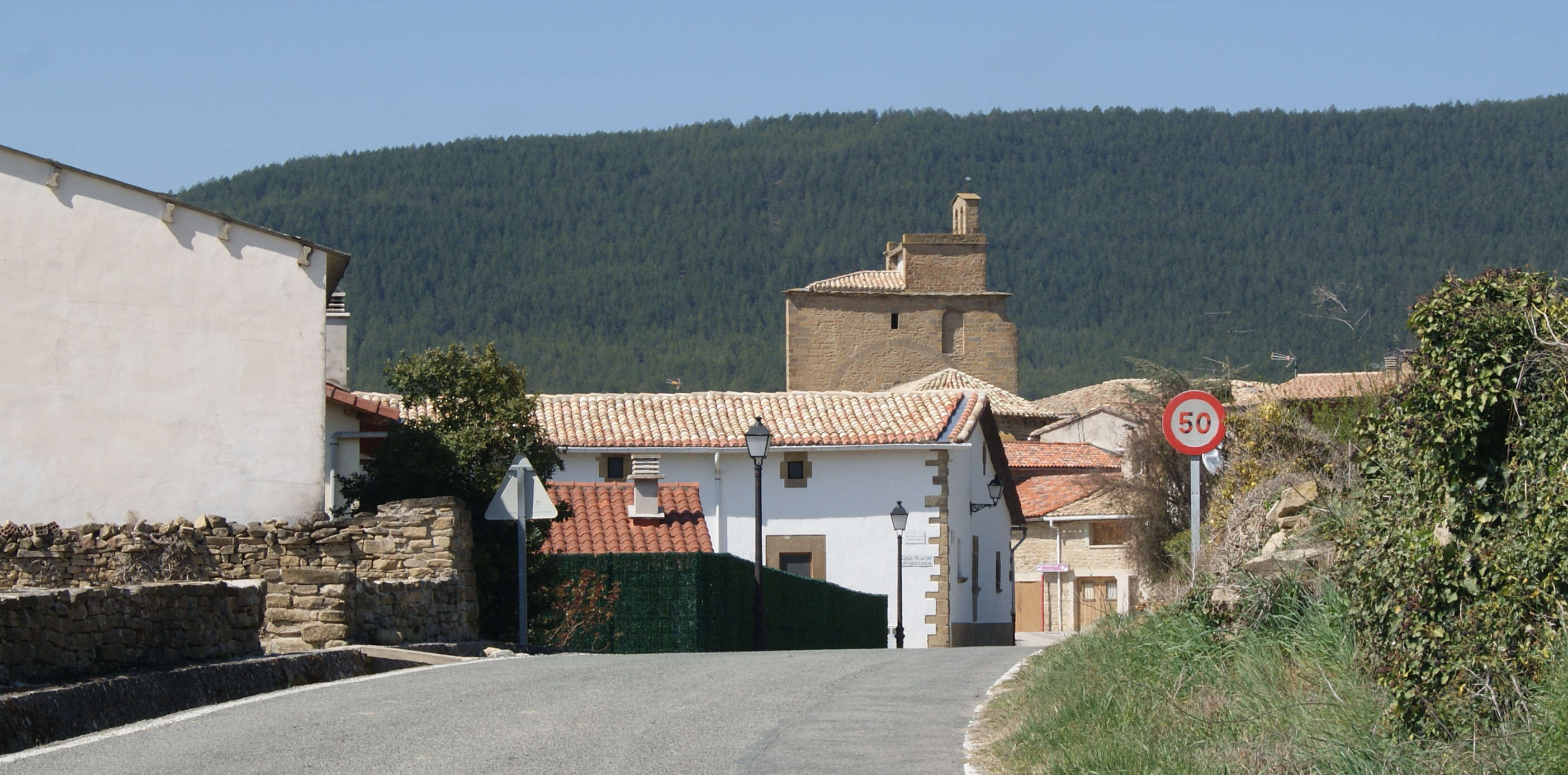
Houses and Roads in Leache

Leache (Basque: Leatxe) is a town and municipality located in the province and autonomous community of Navarre, northern Spain.
