= Úcar =

Municipality in Navarre, Spain

Coordinates: 42°40′N 1°42′W

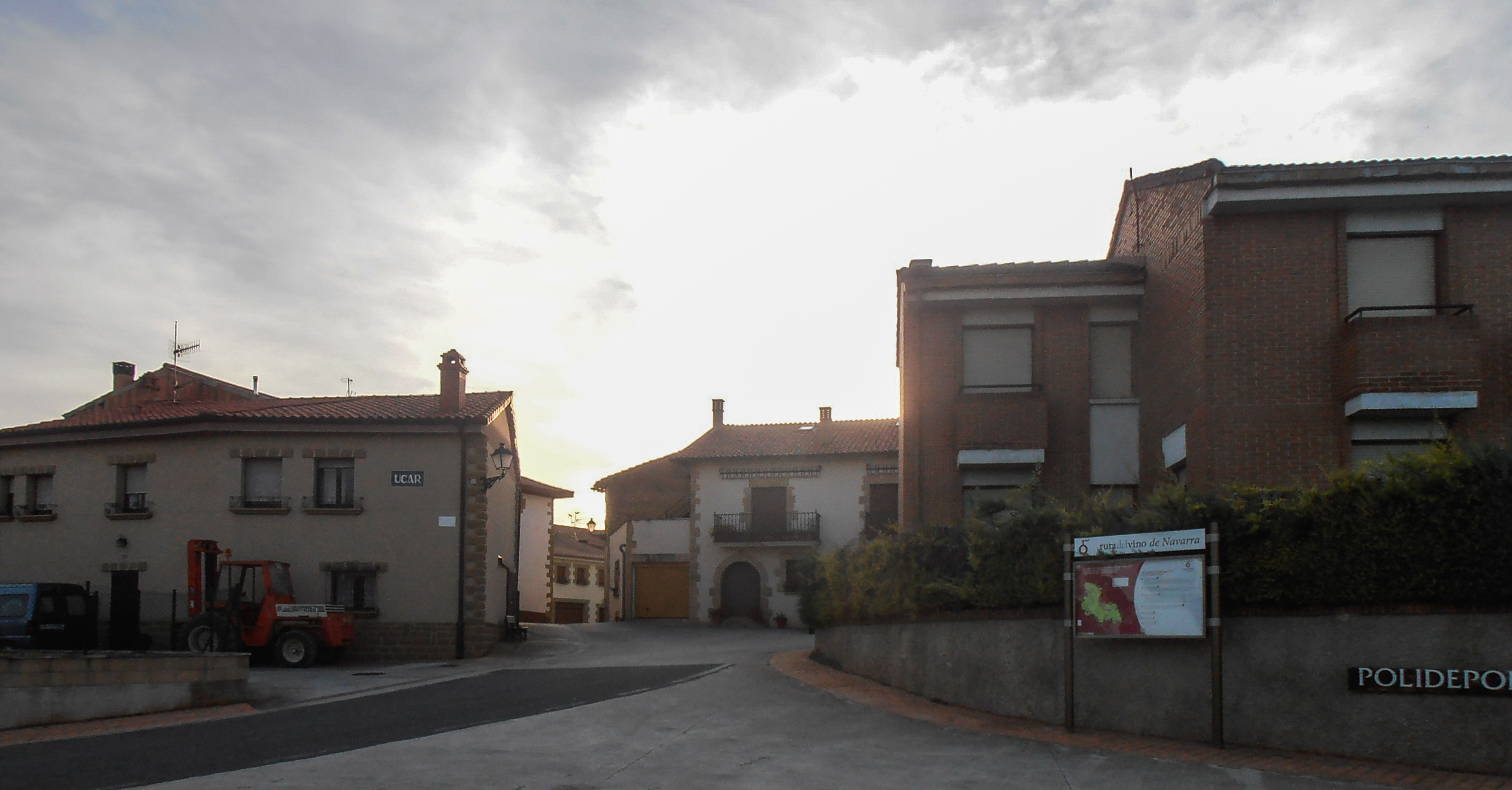
Street of Úcar

Úcar is a town and municipality located in the province and autonomous community of Navarre, northern Spain.
