= Basaburua =

Municipality in Navarre, Spain

Coordinates: 43°00′05″N 1°48′06″W

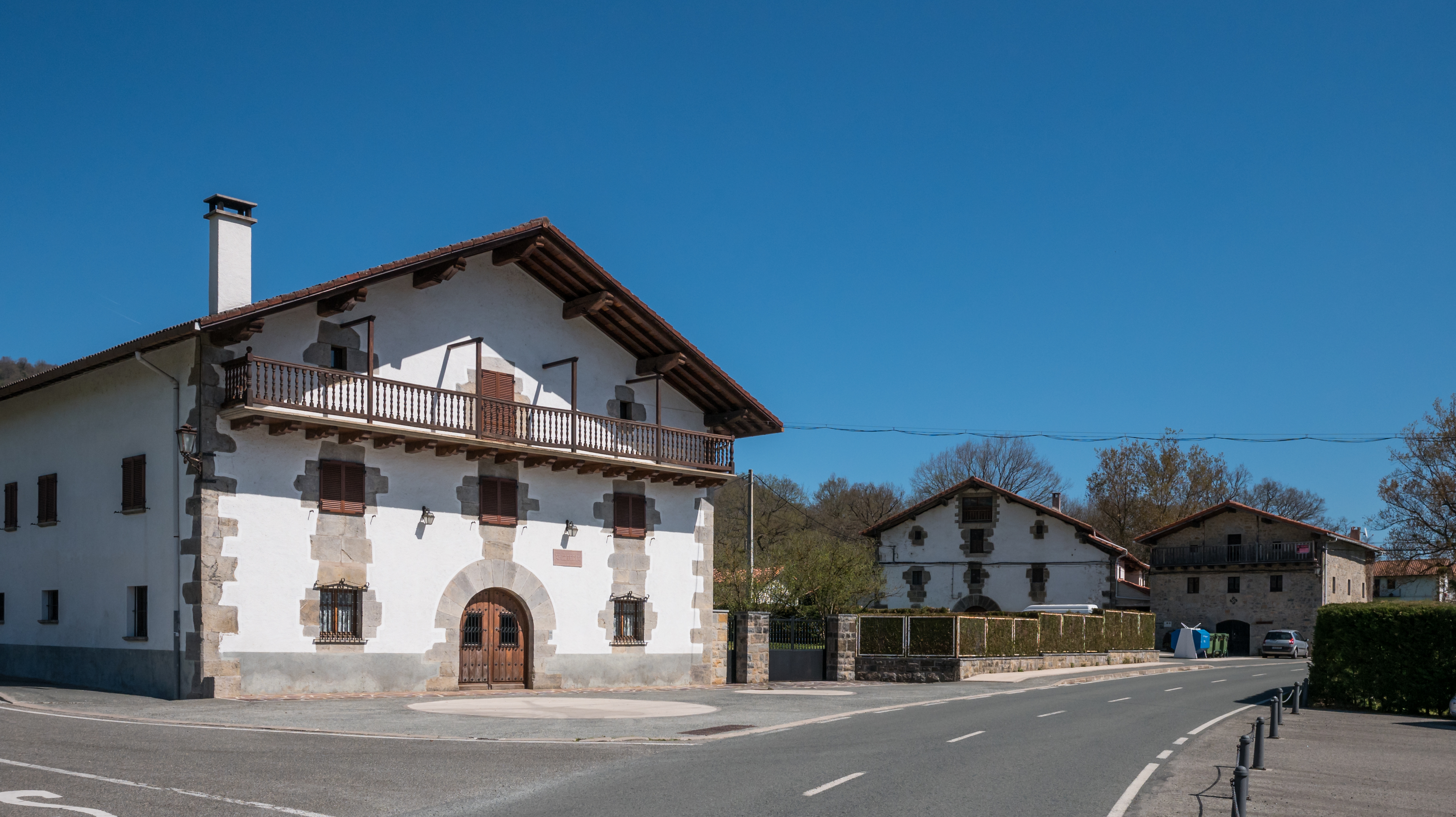
Basaburúa Mayor municipality, Jauntsarats. Navarre, Spain

Basaburua's coat of arms

Basaburua is a town and municipality located in the province and autonomous community of Navarre.
