= Atez – Atetz =

Municipality of Spain

Coordinates: 42°56′22″N 1°42′35″W

Atez (Basque: Atetz) is a town and municipality located in the province and autonomous community of Navarre, northern Spain.

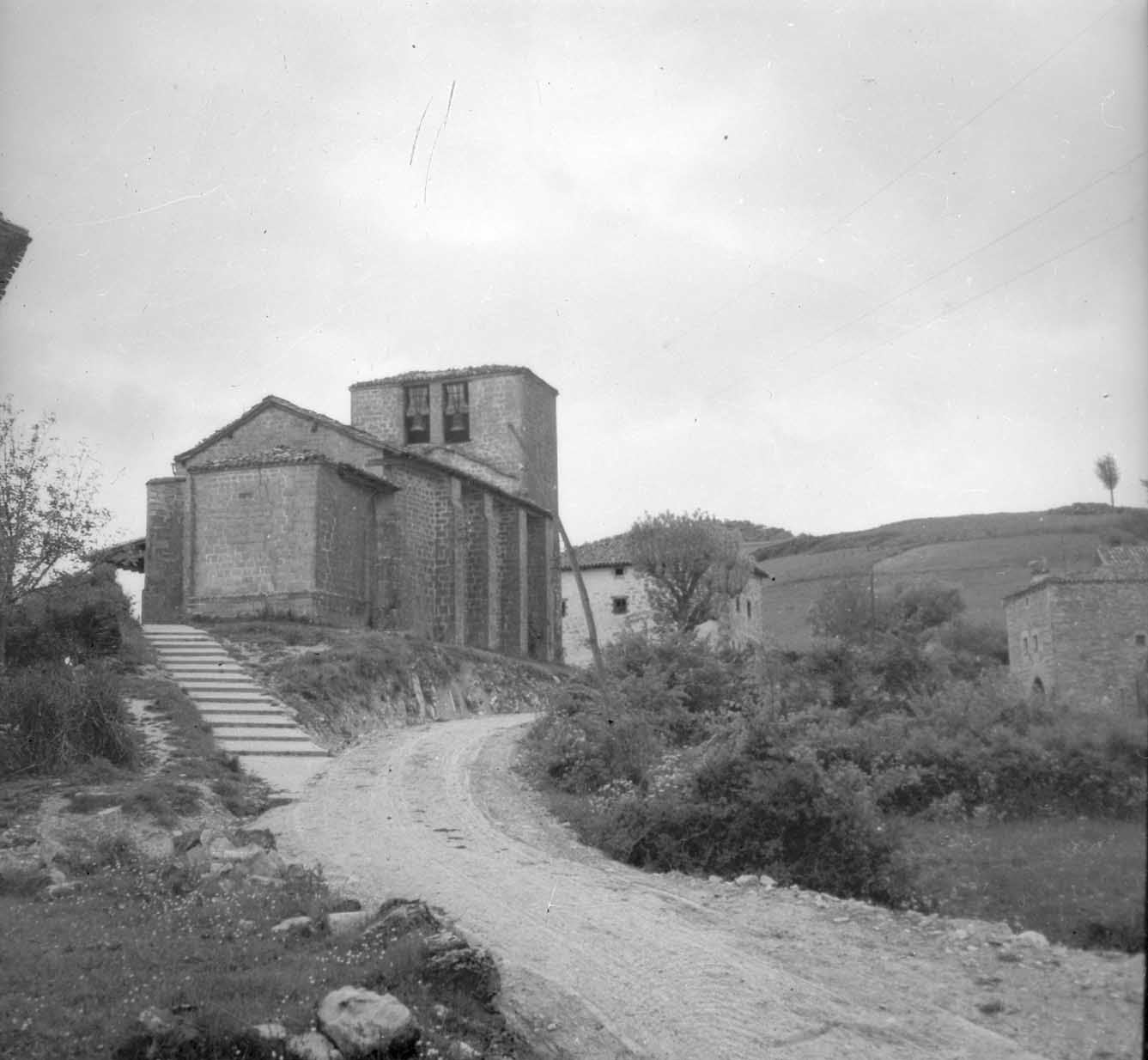
Atez – Atetz

Atez's coat of arms
