= Lónguida – Longida =

Municipality in Navarre, Spain

Coordinates: 42.7572°N 1.38556°W

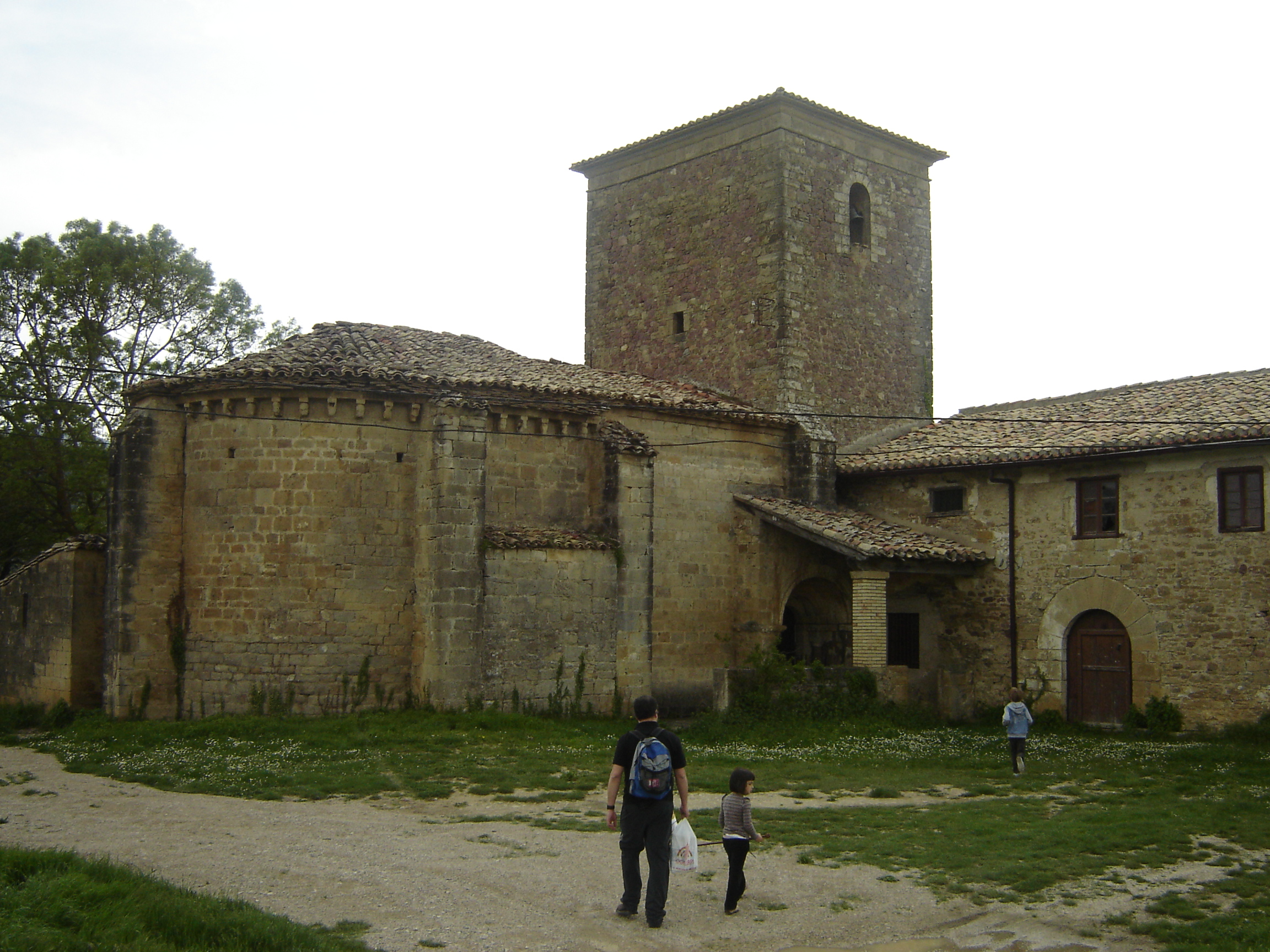

Lónguida – Longida is a town and municipality located in the province and autonomous community of Navarre, northern Spain.
