= Abaurregaina/Abaurrea Alta =

Coordinates: 42°54′N 1°12′W

Abaurregaina / Abaurrea Alta
- Flag Coat of arms
- Nickname: Abaurrea Alta
- Country: Spain
- Autonomous Community: Navarre

Government
  - Mayor: Rafael Ordóñez Iriarte

Area
  - Total: 21.36 km^{2} (8.25 sq mi)
- Elevation: 1,039 m (3,409 ft)

Population (2007)
  - Total: 142
  - Density: 6.65/km^{2} (17.2/sq mi)
- Time zone: UTC+1 (CET)
  - Summer (DST): UTC+2 (CEST)
- Website: http://www.animsa.es/abaurreaalta

Abaurregaina / Abaurrea Alta (Abaurregaina is the Basque name, Abaurrea Alta its name in Spanish; both are recognised officially) is a municipality and inhabited locality situated in the province and autonomous community of Navarre (Spanish: Navarra), northern Spain. It is situated some 70 km from the provincial capital, Pamplona. As of 2005 INE figures, the municipality had a population of c. 150 inhabitants.

The municipality has an area of some 20.9 km^{2}, and with a median elevation of 1039 m is the highest municipality in Navarre.
