= Abaurrepea/Abaurrea Baja =

Coordinates: 42°54′00″N 1°12′00″W

- Flag Coat of arms
- Nickname: Abaurrea Baja
- Abaurrea Baja
- Country: Spain
- Autonomous Community: Navarre
- Comarca: Aunamendi

Government
  - Mayoress: Juan José Salón Arocena

Area
  - Total: 10.89 km^{2} (4.20 sq mi)
- Elevation: 855 m (2,805 ft)

Population (2023)
  - Total: 29
  - Density: 2.7/km^{2} (6.9/sq mi)
- Time zone: UTC+1 (CET)
  - Summer (DST): UTC+2 (CEST)

Abaurrepea/Abaurrea Baja (Abaurrepea is the Basque name, Abaurrea Baja the Spanish; both are recognised officially) is a municipality located in the province and autonomous community of Navarre (Spanish: Navarra), northern Spain. It is situated approximately 67 km from the provincial capital, Pamplona. As of 2005 INE figures, the municipality has a population of c. 41 inhabitants.

Abaurrepea/Abaurrea Baja has an area of 11.1 km², and a median elevation above mean sea level of 855 m.
