= Imotz =

Municipality in Navarre, Spain

Coordinates: 42°57′22″N 1°48′06″W

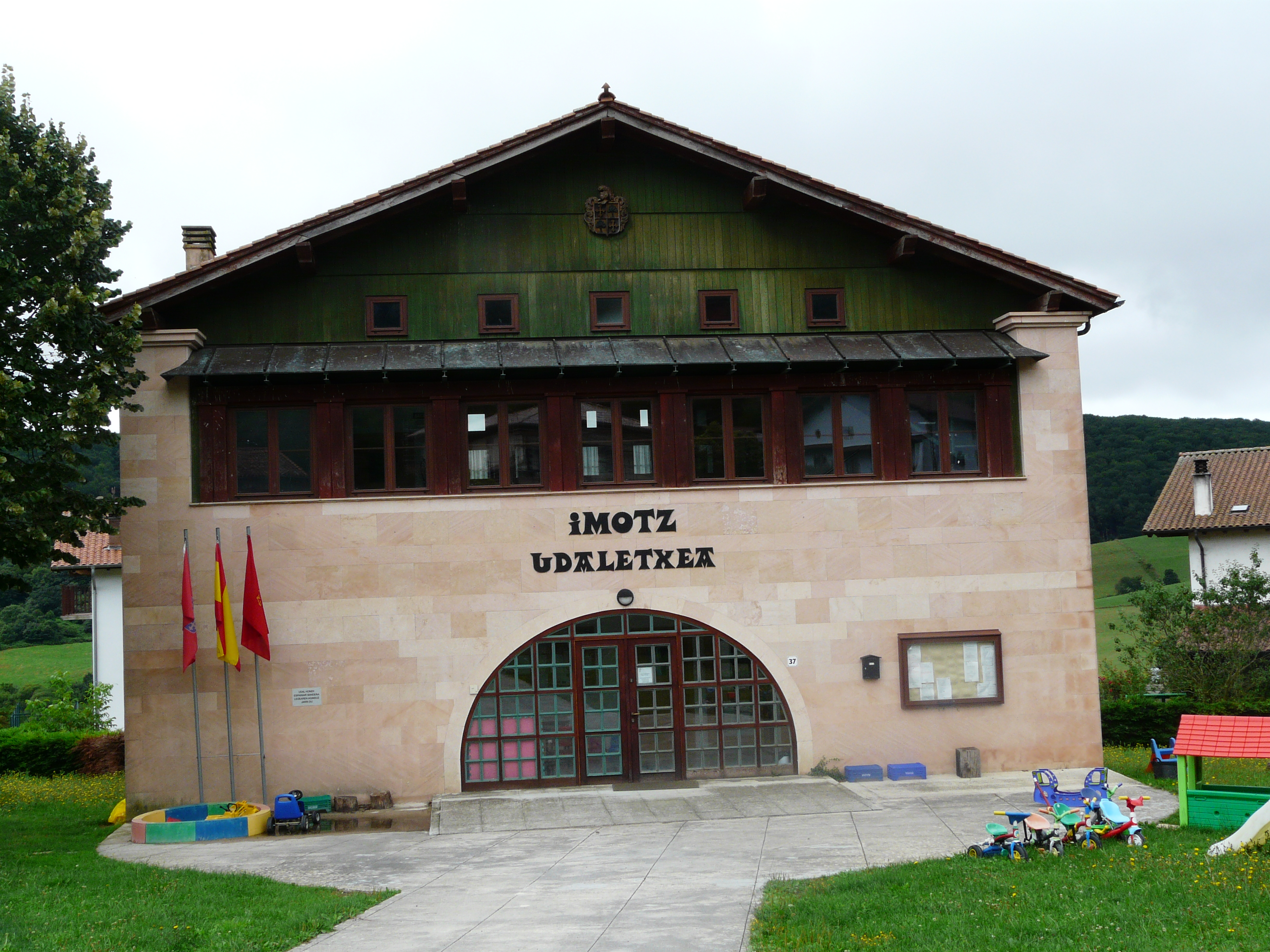
Town hall

Imotz is a town and municipality located in the province and autonomous community of Navarre, northern Spain.
