= Anue =

Municipality of Spain

Coordinates: 42°57′45″N 1°36′22″W

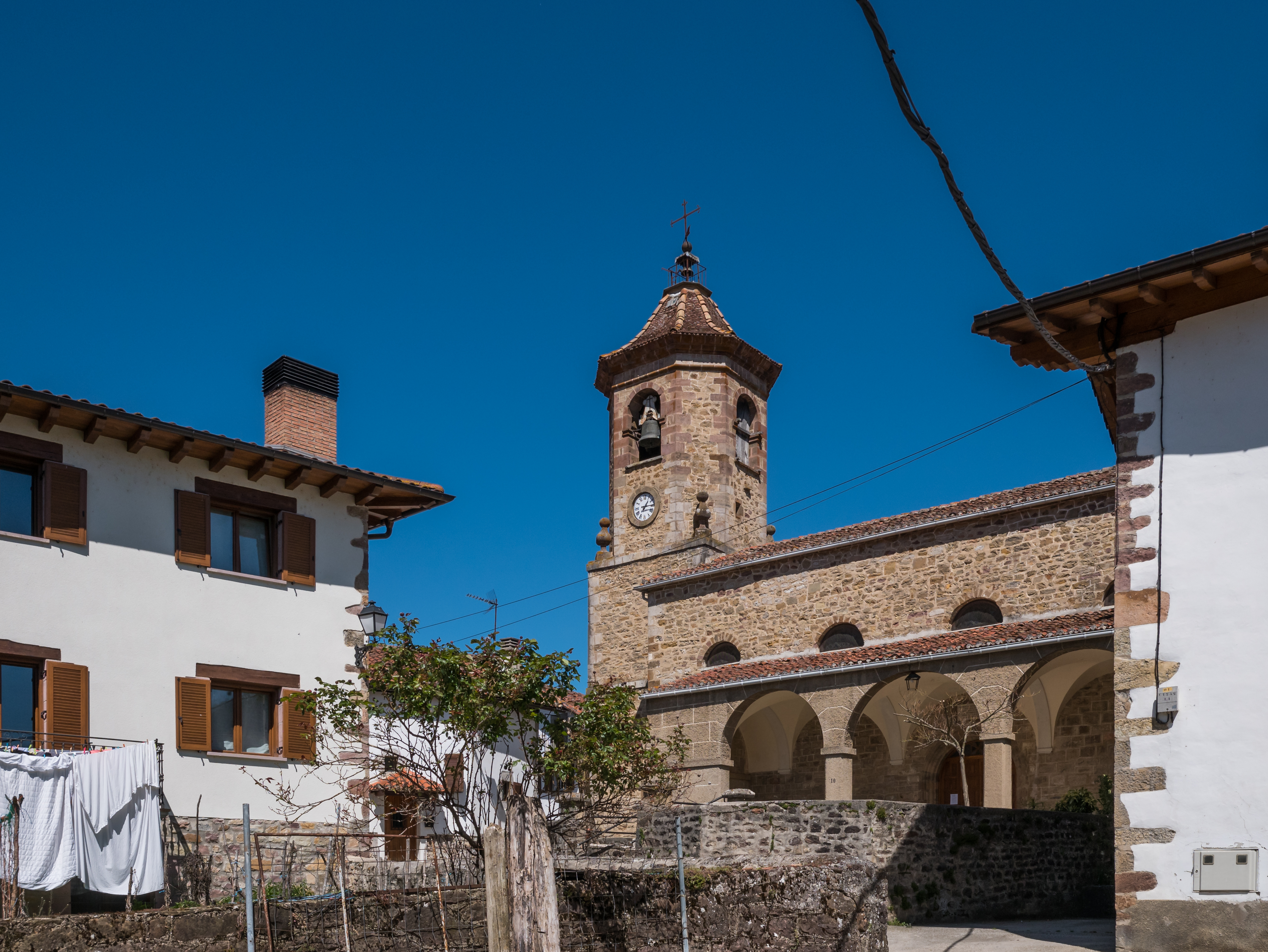
Olagüe in the municipality of Anué, Navarre, Spain

Anue's flag

Anue's coat of arms

Anue is a town and municipality located in the province and autonomous community of Navarre, northern Spain.
