= Odieta =

Town and municipality in northern Spain

Coordinates: 42°56′23″N 1°38′17″W

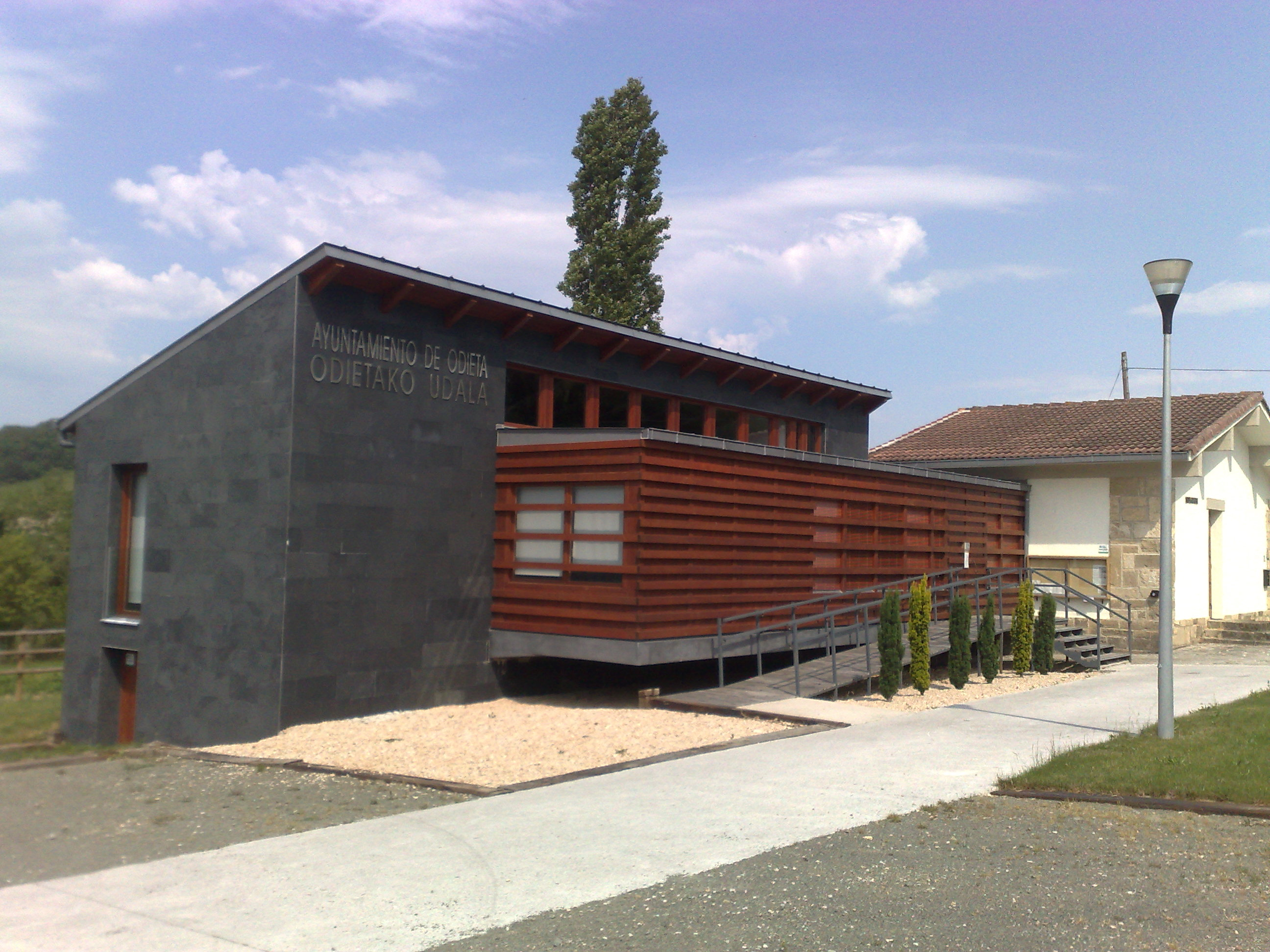
- Council Hall of Odieta in Erripa

- Coat of arms

- Location in Spain.
- Country: Spain
- Autonomous community: Navarra

Government
  - Mayor: Alberto Jose Urdaniz Elizondo

Area
  - Total: 24 km^{2} (9.3 sq mi)
- Elevation: 519 m (1,703 ft)

Population (2025-01-01)
  - Total: 367
  - Density: 15/km^{2} (40/sq mi)
- Time zone: UTC+1 (CET)
  - Summer (DST): UTC+2 (CEST)

Odieta is a town and municipality located in the province and autonomous community of Navarre, northern Spain.
