= Ezcabarte =

Municipality of Spain

Coordinates: 42°51′48″N 1°37′15″W

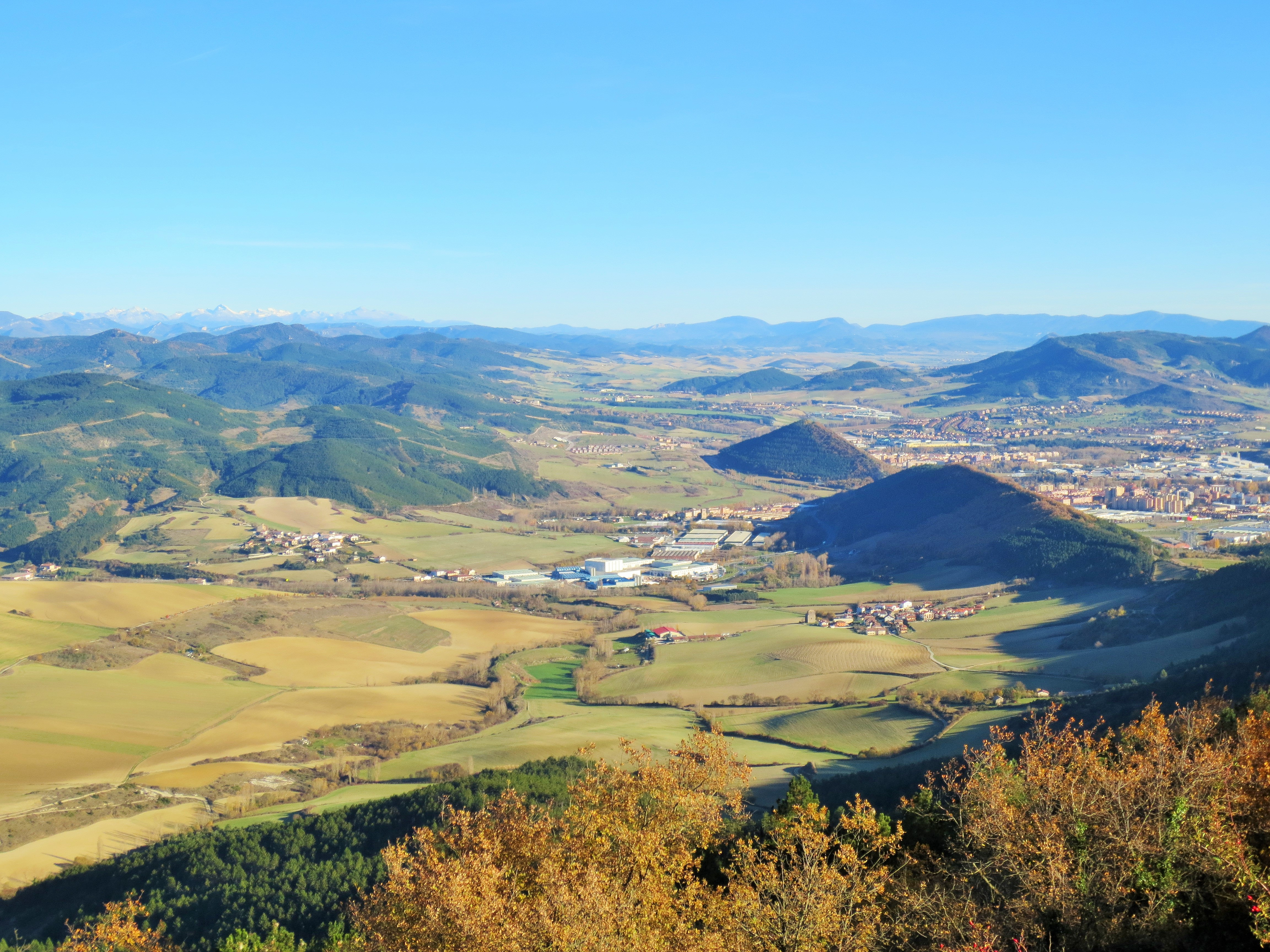
Ezcabarte

Ezcabarte (Basque: Ezkabarte) is a town and municipality located in the province and autonomous community of Navarre, northern Spain.
