= Estella Occidental =

Coordinates: 42°35′0″N 2°20′3″W

- Comarca
- Country: Spain
- Autonomous community: Navarre
- Capital: Viana
- Municipalities: List: See text

Population (2019)
  - Total: 5,862
- Time zone: UTC+1 (CET)
  - Summer (DST): UTC+2 (CEST)

Estella Occidental (Basque: Vianaldea) is a comarca in Navarre, Spain.

== Municipalities ==
The comarca consists of seventeen municipalities, with the largest being the municipality of Viana. They are listed below with their populations at recent censuses, together with the most recent official estimate:

Name	Population Census 2001	Population Census 2011	Population Estimate 2019
Aguilar de Codés	99	100	67
Aras	215	180	153
Armañanzas	83	59	53
Azuelo	47	40	31
Bargota	368	315	257
El Busto	92	74	56
Cabredo	117	108	91
Desojo	126	96	79
Espronceda	166	129	104
Genevilla	111	77	70
Lapoblación	193	144	120
Lazagurría	215	204	189
Marañón	68	56	52
Sansol	109	109	102
Torralba del Río	151	128	103
Torres del Río	172	143	126
Viana	3,425	4,036	4,209
Totals	5,757	5,998	5,862
