= Chasco =

Chasco (Castilian and Old Basque), Txasko (current Basque)
- Language: (Basque Country (autonomous community)) Basque

Origin
- Meaning: Etxe or eche ("house" in Basque)
- Region of origin: Kingdom of Navarre, Basque Country

Other names
- Variant forms: Chasco, Txasko, Echazco, Chasio

The surname Chasco or Txasko is a Basque surname that has its traditional roots in Los Arcos (Kingdom of Navarre in the Basque Country), although it has branches in Navarre itself (in Viana) and in Álava (Santa Cruz de Campezo).

== History and heraldry ==
It is a noble and illustrious lineage of Basque-Navarre origin, whose oldest manor house was located in the town of Los Arcos, in Estella. In this way, the descendants moved to the towns close to Názar, Piedramillera, Torralba del Río, Zúñiga and Esprontzeda. Today, the 18th-century family palace boasts a tower and armadillo, which in turn is adorned with family branches in front of the main square and cathedral. In the same city, the familiar would be associated with other noble families, like the alba one. Furthermore, Juan Chasco, from Los Arcos, was always present at the meetings of the Noble States in the parish cloister and was the highest authority in the city, as numerous notaries testify.

The cognomen dates from 1307, but no records of the nobility were obtained until 1798. Its heraldry consists of a pine tree with a hole at the foot of the trunk and a lion walking; on each side of the tree there is a castle. According to Vicente de Cadenas and Vicente, there is another shield, with a blue background, with a silver padlock with a golden key on the right.

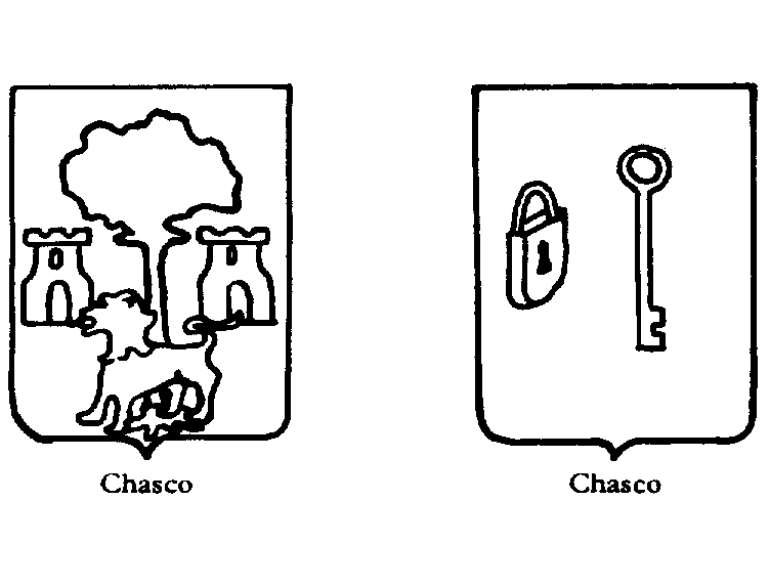
Heraldic shield of Chasco

== Etymology ==
According to Euskaltzaindia its current spelling for Basque-speakers would have to adopt the tx and the k of the current Euskera, replacing 'Chasco' by Txasko.

Traditional spelling	Current academic spelling
Chasco	Txasko

There are at least two hypotheses about the origin of the surname, all dating back to the Basque language:

- Euskal deituren izendegia (Philippe Oyhamburu): Etxazko ("house") or Sasko (from sasi, "bush");
- Basque nicknames (Endika de Mogrobejo): Txasko ("land of bushes")

Finally, the two authors combined the etymology of the surname with the derivative "false". Regardless, and despite both authors trying to find roots in Basque from the terms "house" or "bush", nothing significant can be said.

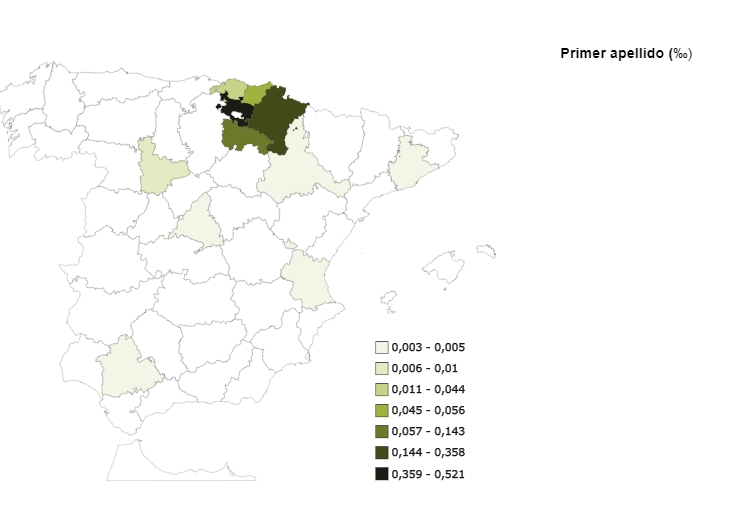
Distribution of the surname Chasco in the Iberian Peninsula

== See also ==
- Chascomús
