= Marañón =

Marañón may refer to:

- Marañón, Navarre, a town and municipality in Spain
- Marañón River, in Peru
- Marañón Province, in Peru
- Valle del Marañón, a valley in Peru
- Gregorio Marañón (1887–1960), Spanish physician, historian, writer and philosopher
- Marañón (footballer), real name Rafael Carlos Pérez González, Spanish footballer
- the Spanish word for the cashew apple in Central America

== See also ==
- Maranhão - Brazilian state
