= Antonio Alcalá Venceslada =

Spanish writer, poet

Antonio Alcalá Venceslada (1883–1955) was a Spanish writer and scholar of Andalusia. Following college years in Jaen, where his master was Francisco Ureña Navas, he studied in Málaga, Granada and Sevilla. As an archivist/librarian, he worked in Compostela, Cádiz, Huelva and Jaén. He also taught at the Instituto Virgen del Carmen in Jaén.

Alcalá Venceslada was a renowned authority on Andalusian popular culture. He wrote many books, the most important of which, a reference work called Vocabulario Andaluz, was published in 1934. The author was awarded the sum of 10,000 pesetas by the Real Academia Española de la Lengua as a result. The book has been reprinted many times since. Other works include De la solera fina (Jaén, 1925) and La flor de la canela (Andújar, 1946). He was also a noted poet. According to Alfonso de Urquijo, Alcalá Venceslada was "el poeta montero de España". A street and a college in Jaen are named after him, likewise a small street in Andújar.
