= Torredonjimeno =

- Municipality
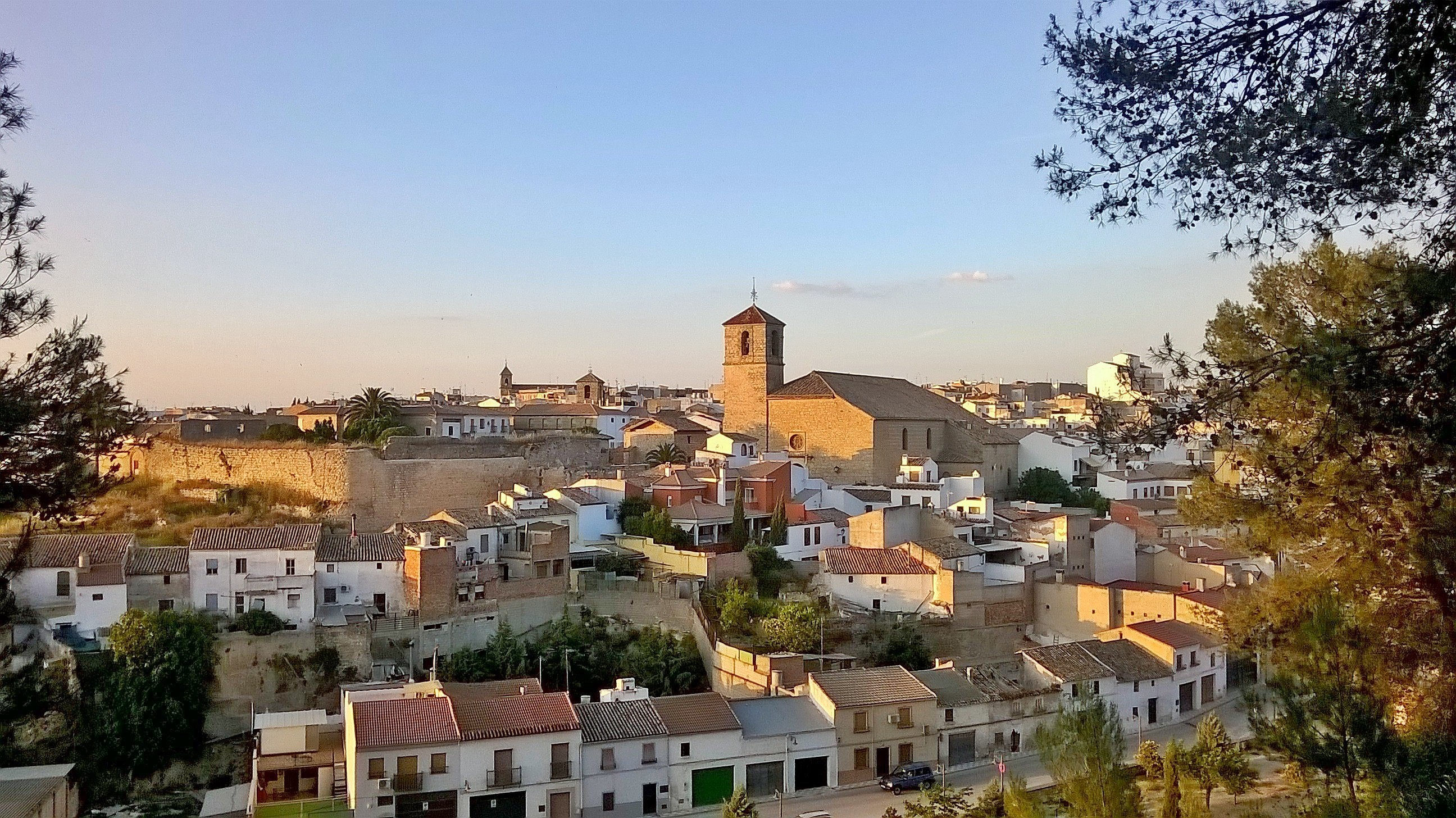

- Flag Coat of arms

- Location in the Province of Jaén Torredonjimeno (Andalusia) Torredonjimeno (Spain)
- Coordinates: 37°46′N 3°57′W
- Country: Spain
- Autonomous community: Andalusia
- Province: Jaén
- Comarca: Metropolitana
- Judicial district: Martos

Area
  - Total: 157.8 km^{2} (60.9 sq mi)
- Elevation: 586 m (1,923 ft)

Population (2025-01-01)
  - Total: 13,213
  - Density: 83.73/km^{2} (216.9/sq mi)
- Demonym(s): tosiriano, -a
- Time zone: UTC+1 (CET)
  - Summer (DST): UTC+2 (CEST)

Torredonjimeno is a city and municipality of Spain located in the province of Jaén, in the autonomous community of Andalusia. According to the 2020 census (INE), the city had a population of 13,632 inhabitants, with 6,954 males and 7,172 females. It covers an area of 157 km2 and is at an elevation of 586 m.

== Notable people ==
- Miguel Gómez Damas (1785-1849), general and Carlist commander
- Francisco Ureña Navas (1871-1936), publisher and poet of Integrist/Carlist leaning

== See also ==
- List of municipalities in Jaén
