= Cabredo =

Village in Navarre, Spain

Coordinates: 42°38′N 2°24′W

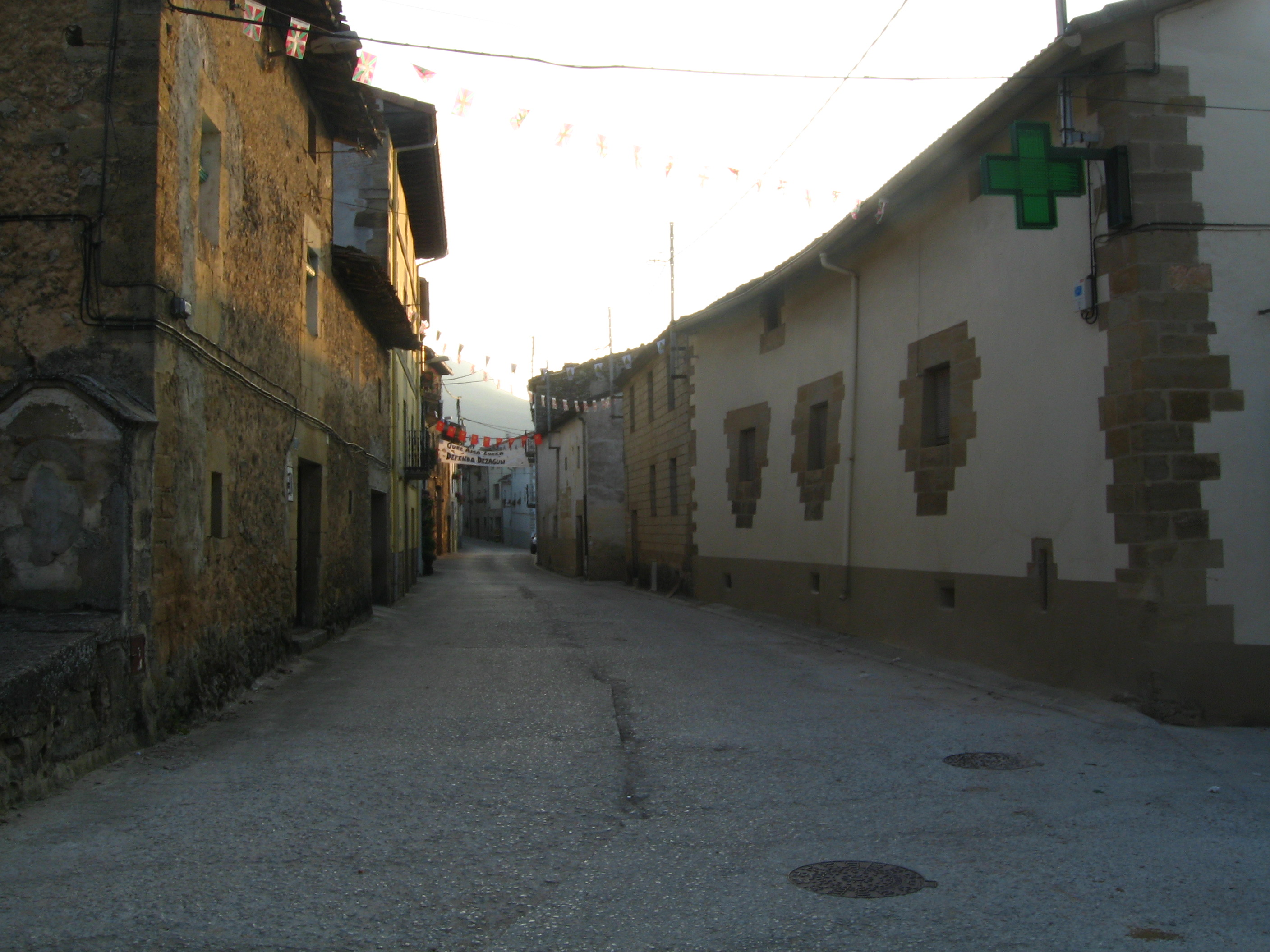
Cabredo village

Cabredo is a Spanish village located in the west of Navarre near the border with Álava, 79 kilometres (49 mi) from Pamplona, the capital of the Chartered Community of Navarre. In 2012 it had a population of 109 inhabitants. It is located below the Codes mountain range and crossed by the Ega river.

Cabredo's coat of arms

== Geography ==
Cabredo has a total surface of 11.90 square metres (128.1 sq ft), and it borders Genevilla to the north, Aguilar de Codes to the east and Marañon to the South. It is inside the region of Estella.

== History ==
Cabredo is situated in the valley of Aguilar, right below the Codes mountain range. Therefore most of its history is related to this area. Cabredo always belonged to the Kingdom of Navarre. Nevertheless in the 19th century it was briefly a part of Álava, in 1822 and in 1840. In the latter occasion it was the complaints of the local authorities that made the village return to the Navarre territory.

From the 15th to the 18th century Cabredo was the venue of an important sculpture workshop in which the best artists of the area worked.

== Art ==
The principal work of art in Cabredo is the James the Greater church. It dates back to the 16th century and its magnificent wooden wall was built in the 17th century. In the church there are also two valuable altarpieces, one dedicated to the Ecce Homo and the other one to Our Lady of the Rosary.

Cabredo is shaped as a transitory town. It is built around two parallel streets and there are two little chapels in it. One is dedicated to Saint Christ, dating back to the 16th century and another one honouring Simeon. About 500 meters away from the village there is another chapel built in the 19th century which is dedicated to the Our Lady of Carrascal..

== Important people ==
In Cabredo was born Baltasar Jaime Martínez de Compañón who was a prelate who served as Bishop of Trujillo, Peru from 1779 to 1790, at Trujillo Cathedral, and Archbishop of Bogotá New Granada, from 1790 to 1797. He was responsible for founding new towns, building schools, and reforming the silver mine at Hualgayoc. He is most remarkable for his efforts to educate Trujillo's Indians and for his research into local plants, animals, archaeological ruins, music, and native cultures.

In 2011 the Ruta Quetzal honoured the memory and the work he did in South America by naming that year's expedition with his name and visiting the town he was born in, which was called La Aventura de Martínez Compañón en Perú, del Desierto Moche a la Selva Amazónica.

== Festivities ==
Cabredo's mayor festival is held the third weekend of September, which is celebrated in memory of San Simeon Labrador. A variety of activities are carried out these days, such as a mass honouring the local saint and a popular dinner.
