= Jesús Elizalde Sainz de Robles =

Spanish politician

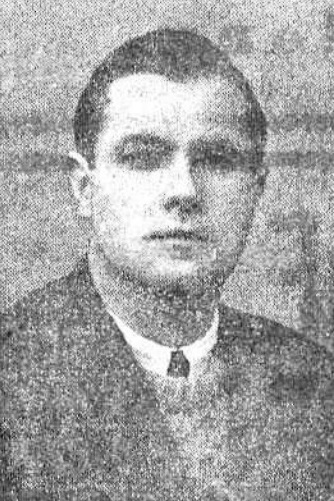
- Born: Jesús Elizalde Sainz de Robles; 1907; Viana, Spain
- Died: 1980 (aged 72–73); Vejer de la Frontera, Spain
- Occupation: lawyer
- Known for: politician
- Political party: Comunión Tradicionalista

Jesús Elías Francisco Elizalde Sainz de Robles (1907–1980) was a Spanish Carlist politician. He served in the Cortes in two separate strings: during the Second Republic in 1936 and during Francoism in 1954–1958. In 1938-1939 he was a member of Junta Política of Falange Española Tradicionalista, and in 1954-1958 he was a member of FET's Consejo Nacional. In 1942-1944 he headed the regional Carlist Navarrese organization. Politically he sided with the Carlist branch which opted for conciliatory policy towards the Franco regime and leaned towards a monarchist dynastical alliance.

== Family and youth ==
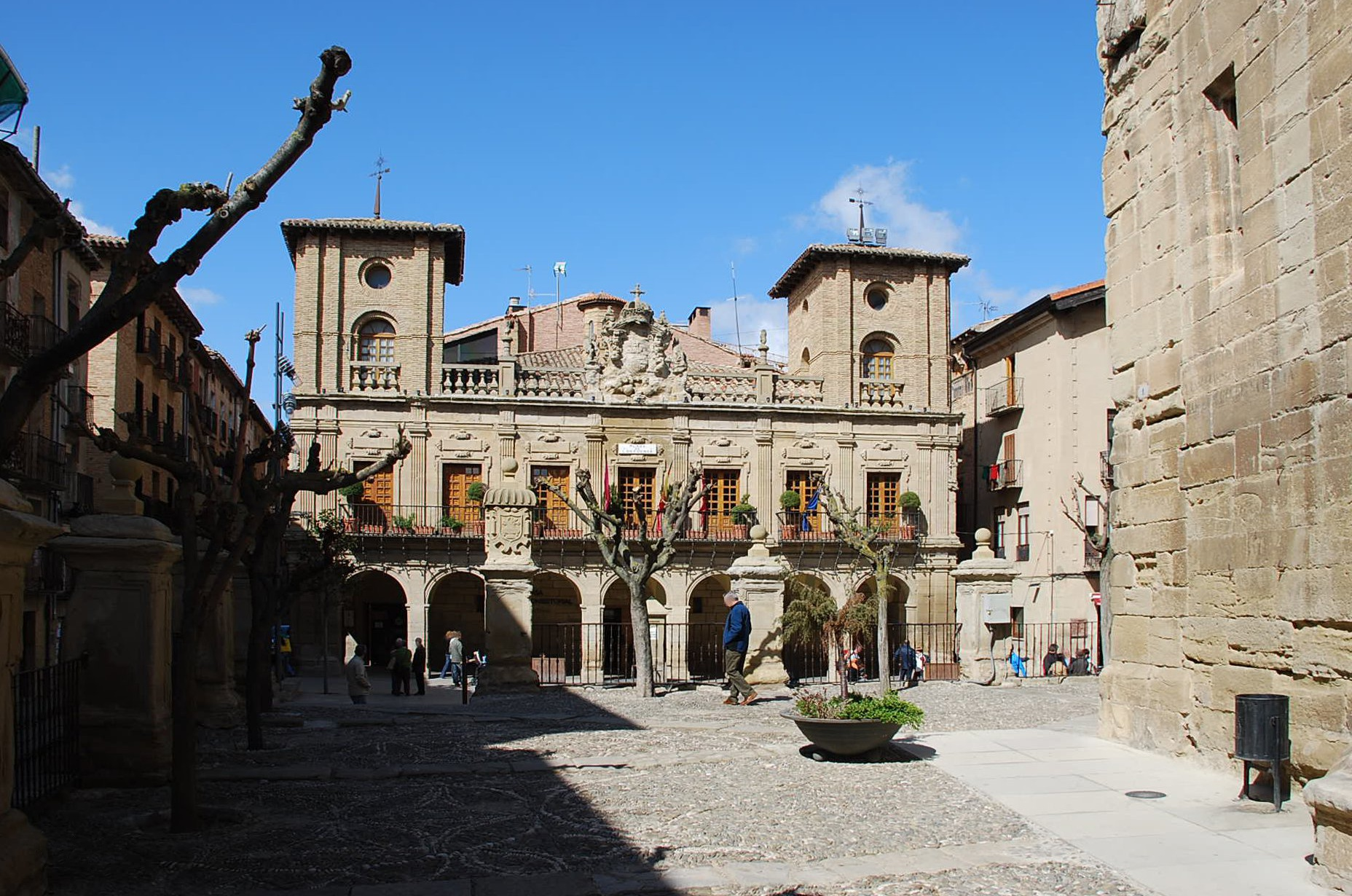
Viana

Jesús’ ancestors can be traced back only to the early 18th century. His great-great-grandfather José Elizalde Martínez de Vidaurre was related to Viana, noted as “maestro ensamblador”; over time the family grew to prosperity, though little is known of his great-grandfather Juan Elizalde Alonso and grandfather Lino María Elizalde Navarro. His father, Fructuoso Elizalde Sabando (1858–1944), was among the most prestigious Viana personalities, listed as “rico propietario”. In the 1890s he entered the Viana ayuntamiento as segundo alcalde and between 1893 and 1903 he served as mayor of the town. In 1895 Fructuoso married Guadalupe Sainz de Robles (born 1872) from Arnedo; she was daughter to Víctor Sainz de Robles, director of Instituto de Segunda Enseñanza from the nearby Calahorra. The couple settled on the family estate in Viana; they had 6 children, born between 1896 and 1912: Casilda, José María, Jesús, Carmen, Pilar and Ángel Elizalde Sainz de Robles.

Jesús was first educated in Escuela Industrial y de Artes y Oficios in Logroño, where he studied at the turn of the 1910s and 1920s. Following bachillerato at unspecified time he enrolled at the Faculty of Law in the University of Oviedo, where he was recorded in 1927. However, he graduated in jurisprudence at the University of Zaragoza as late as in 1934; none of the sources consulted clarifies why he switched from Asturias to Aragón, why it took him at least 7 years to complete the curriculum and why he majored at a relatively late age of 26. In early 1935 Elizalde was formally incorporated into the Colegio de Abogados of Pamplona, though it is not clear whether he practiced before the outbreak of the Civil War.

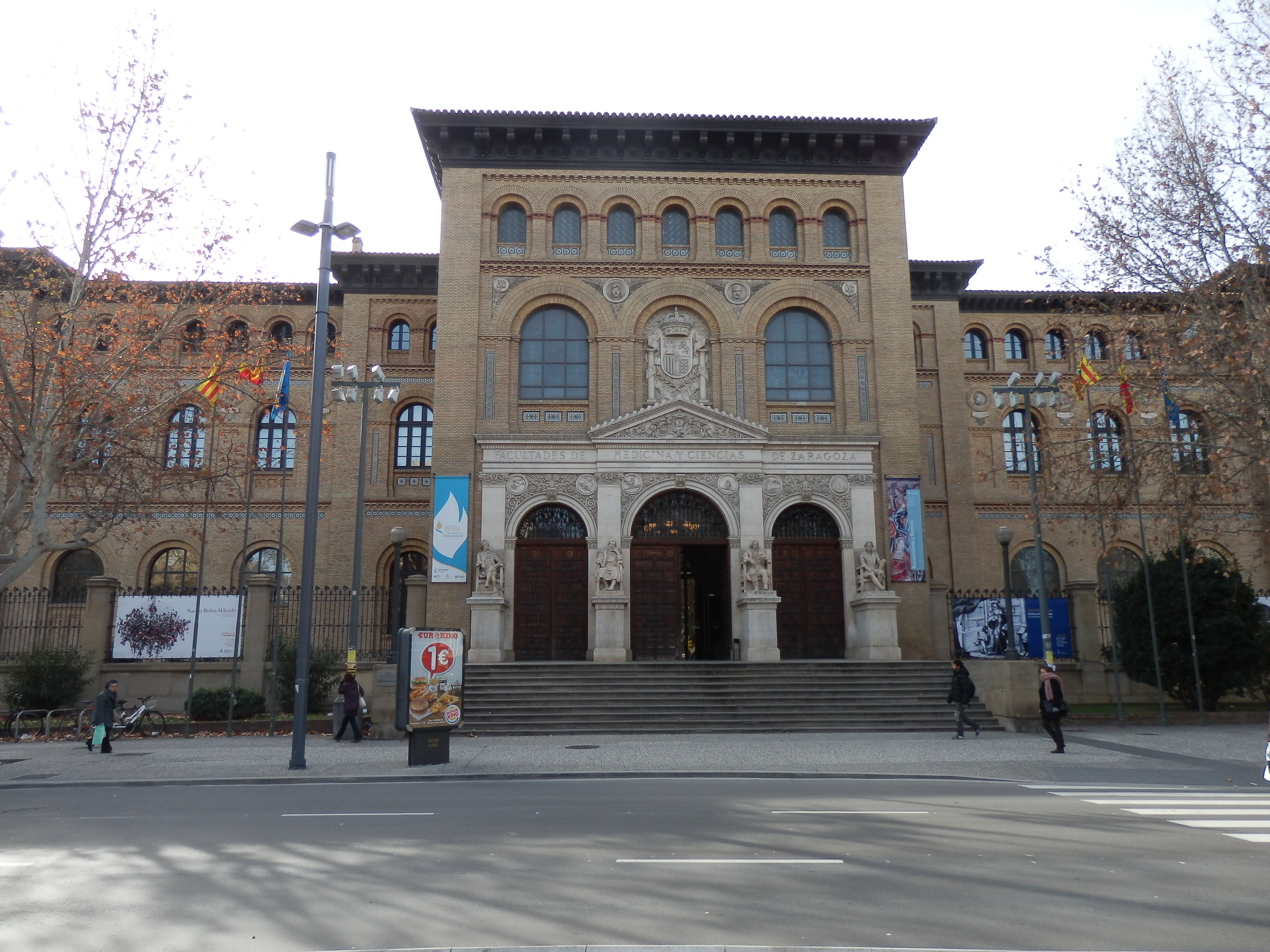
Zaragoza University

At unspecified time Elizalde married María del Socorro Ureña y Mantilla de los Ríos (died 2010). She was daughter to Francisco Ureña Navas, a locally recognized Andalusian poet and literary critic, publisher and leader of a literary group El Madroño; along maternal line she descended from the well-off Andalusian Mantilla de los Ríos family, owners of numerous landholdings and related to the aristocratic Marqués de Casa Saavedra branch. Jesús and Socorro had no children; after the war they resided in Madrid, though the couple co-owned also a small estate in Vejer de la Frontera. Among Elizalde's relatives his nephew Felipe Zalba Elizalde became a religious and served as bishop of Arequipa; another one, Inocencio Zalba Elizalde, was moderately engaged in Carlism of the 1960s. Jesús’ younger brother, Ángel Elizalde Sainz de Robles, served as requeté and died in combat in 1939; his sister Carmen became member of the Damas Apostólicas congregation.

== Republic ==
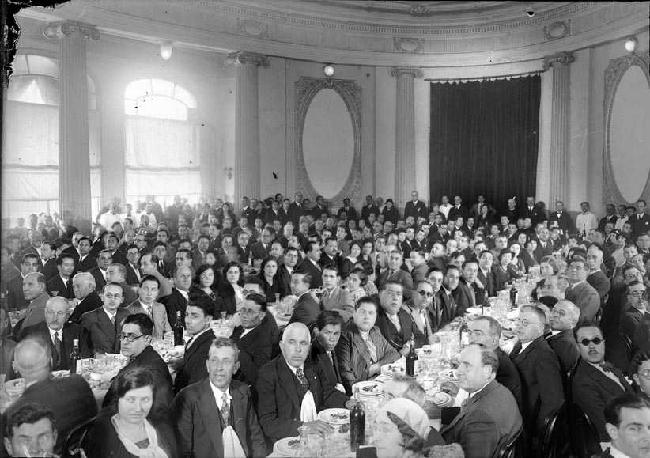
Carlist meeting, 1930s

Elizalde was born into the Carlist family; his father engaged in the movement and mixed with some Navarrese deputies, though he did not hold prestigious positions in the party. It is not clear when Jesús himself became active within Traditionalist ranks. He was first noted as a speaker during Carlist rallies in April 1932, not only in his native Navarre but also in Cantabria and Catalonia, appearing already among party heavyweights like Pradera, Rodezno or Bilbao. In 1933-1934 he was repeatedly noted addressing the crowd, be it in minor Vasco-navarrese locations like Bargota, Lerin, Villava, Haro, Oñate, Arceniega and Laguardia or in larger cities like Vitoria, Pamplona, Palencia, Zaragoza and even in Madrid. Hailed in the party press as “culto abogado” and author of “beautiful lectures”, Elizalde lambasted the Republic as a regime which brought nothing but misery, denounced parliamentarian democracy as a system which turned Spaniards into slaves of caciques and trade-unionists, and declared Marxism and separatism two principal enemies of the country. He praised organicist suffrage, within limits permitted by censorship advocated virtues of traditionalist monarchy and made veiled references to dynastic claim of the Carlist royal pretender, Don Alfonso Carlos.

By mid-1930s Elizalde already gained some prominence within the Navarrese Carlism. In 1934 Luis Arellano, leader of the nationwide party youth, nominated him head of its regional branch. Elizalde started to preside over Traditionalist rallies. By scholars he is counted among the Carlist “rising propagandists” using increasingly violent and intransigent language. Elizalde's rancor was addressed not only against left-wing parties; he denounced Renovación Española as s "general staff without an army" and referred to CEDA as hypocritical “católicos de intereses”, whose failure “fills us with joy”. On the other hand, he made some effort to court supporters of the cedista youth organisation JAP and the Basque Catholics from PNV.

Carlist standard

Prior to the 1936 elections Elizalde was a locally known young propagandist, but in course of the campaign he was somewhat unexpectedly elevated to nationwide prominence. Esteban Bilbao, the party tycoon elected to the Cortes from Pamplona in 1931 and 1933, declared himself fed up with parliamentarism and decided not to stand. His place on the list of regional right-wing coalition was offered to Elizalde, the friend of Arellano, who in turn was the protégé of the Navarrese Carlist leader, conde de Rodezno. Unión de Derechas emerged triumphant from the race and all of its candidates were elected; Elizalde gathered 78,159 votes out of 155,699 votes cast and became the youngest member of the 10-member Traditionalist minority in the Cortes. During his brief, 5-month service in the chamber he remained a passive deputy. Not a single time was he noted as taking to the floor; if recorded by the press it was rather because of his presence at Carlist public rallies.

== Civil War ==
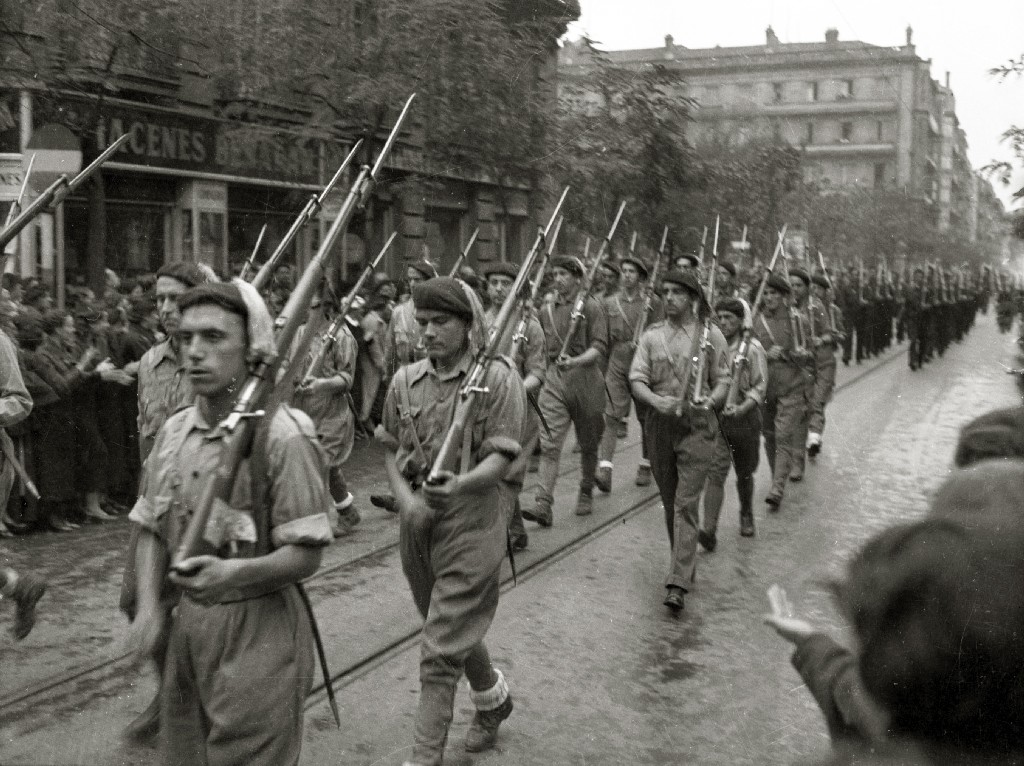
requetés, 1936

In the early summer of 1936 Elizalde was actively engaged in the anti-republican conspiracy. At the time the Carlists were divided over terms of access to planned military rising; the faction led by Fal Conde demanded political concessions, the group led by Rodezno preferred to join almost unconditionally. Elizalde formed part of the rodeznistas; in July he travelled to Saint Jean de Luz and managed to win over the claimant. Upon outbreak of hostilities he joined Junta Central Carlista de Guerra de Navarra, the regional wartime executive, and helped to organize requeté troops advancing towards Gipuzkoa. On July 23 he joined the Carlist volunteer units sent to Zaragoza; it is not clear whether he served as requeté or as an accompanying political leader. During next few months he shuttled on propaganda tours across the Nationalist-held zone, first to Teruel (July) and then to Sierra de Guadarrama (August), Burgos, Pamplona (September), Andalusia (October), Navarre, Salamanca (December) and Zamora (January 1937). At that time he was already at the requeté rank of alférez.

In early 1937 Elizalde seemed somewhat uneasy about heavy-handed military policy towards the Carlist executive and asked Junta Central to demand that Fal Conde be allowed return from forced exile; he made unclear hints about would-be rupture between the army the Carlists. He did not form part of the nationwide party leadership and did not participate in a series of crucial meetings debating the threat of forced political unification; eventually he approached the rodeznistas, who advocated compliance with Franco's dictate. In May 1937 the official decree nominated him one of two "asesores políticos" of the newly formed unificated Milicia Nacional. Not exactly within top strata, thus Elizalde became one of 20-odd Carlists on positions of importance within the new state party, Falange Española Tradicionalista.

Falangist standard

During the next two years Elizalde vacillated between conciliatory rodeznistas and intransigent falcondistas. In late 1937 the latter considered him a candidate to new Navarrese executive, about to replace the one supposedly sold-out to Franco. Indeed, he publicly voiced unease about Falangist political domination, yet in March 1938 the dictator as part of his political balancing game nominated Elizalde to Junta Política of FET. In the new role he tried to cultivate Carlist identity by focusing on requeté effort at public rallies or lambasting “intolerable” domination of Falangist threads in official propaganda. In February 1939, soon after death of his younger brother had turned into a demonstration of Traditionalist loyalty, Elizalde addressed Franco with a letter which protested marginalisation of Carlism and in correspondence with Fernández-Cuesta argued over local provincial appointments. Shortly prior to Nationalist triumph in the Civil War he handed over his resignation as political advisor to Milicia Nacional; according to some sources at the same time or soon afterwards he resigned also his position in Junta Politica. In February 1939 Fal Conde nominated him to new Navarrese regional executive, led by Joaquín Baleztena and expected to ensure loyalty to the nationwide Carlist leadership.

== Early Francoism ==
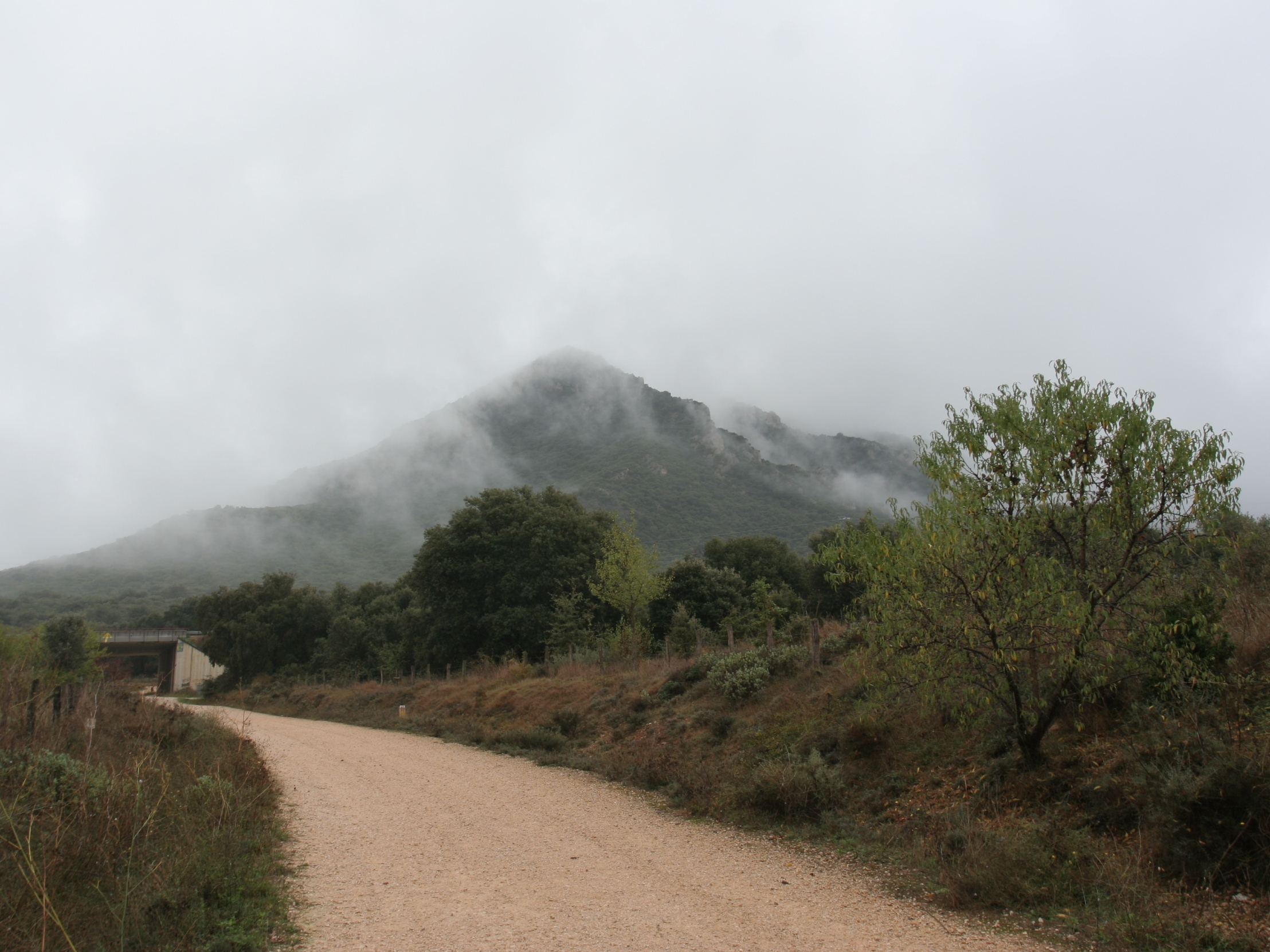
Montejurra

Following the end of wartime hostilities Elizalde remained moderately active as a Carlist propagandist, yet he did not go off limits permitted by the official Francoist framework. Restrained by dictatorial features of the regime he joined efforts to find non-political ways of expressing Traditionalist identity and contributed to launch of the annual Montejurra ascent. However, he was getting increasingly detached from Navarre; in 1940 Elizalde settled in Madrid, where he joined the local Colegio de Abogados and started to practice as a lawyer. Historiographic works discussing internal squabbles within Navarrese Carlism of the very early 1940s list him as moderately involved. However, as fragmentation within the party ranks triggered another crisis, in 1942 Fal Conde dismissed Baleztena as the Navarrese party leader and nominated Elizalde the new head of Junta Regional.

In his new role Elizalde had to confront growing bewilderment and confusion; local party leaders were increasingly divided over collaboration with Francoist structures and rapprochement with the Alfonsists. Rather scarce evidence related to Elizalde's leadership demonstrates that he preferred a firm stand towards the regime; in 1942 he suggested that Carlists leave all official structures in protest over the Begoña incident; in 1943 he co-signed so-called Reclamación del Poder, an address which demanded instauration of Traditionalist monarchy; in 1944 he voiced in favor of Carlists joining a monarchist conspiracy against Franco. His position on dynastic issues is unclear. Though a trustee of Fal Conde, already in 1943 he was in touch with Rodezno about negotiations with the Alfonsist claimant Don Juan. In 1944 the entire Junta Regional demanded from the regent Don Javier that he calls for a grand Carlist assembly, which in turn would terminate the regency and elect a new king. As Fal Conde and Don Javier rejected the plan, in November 1944 the entire Junta resigned in corpore.

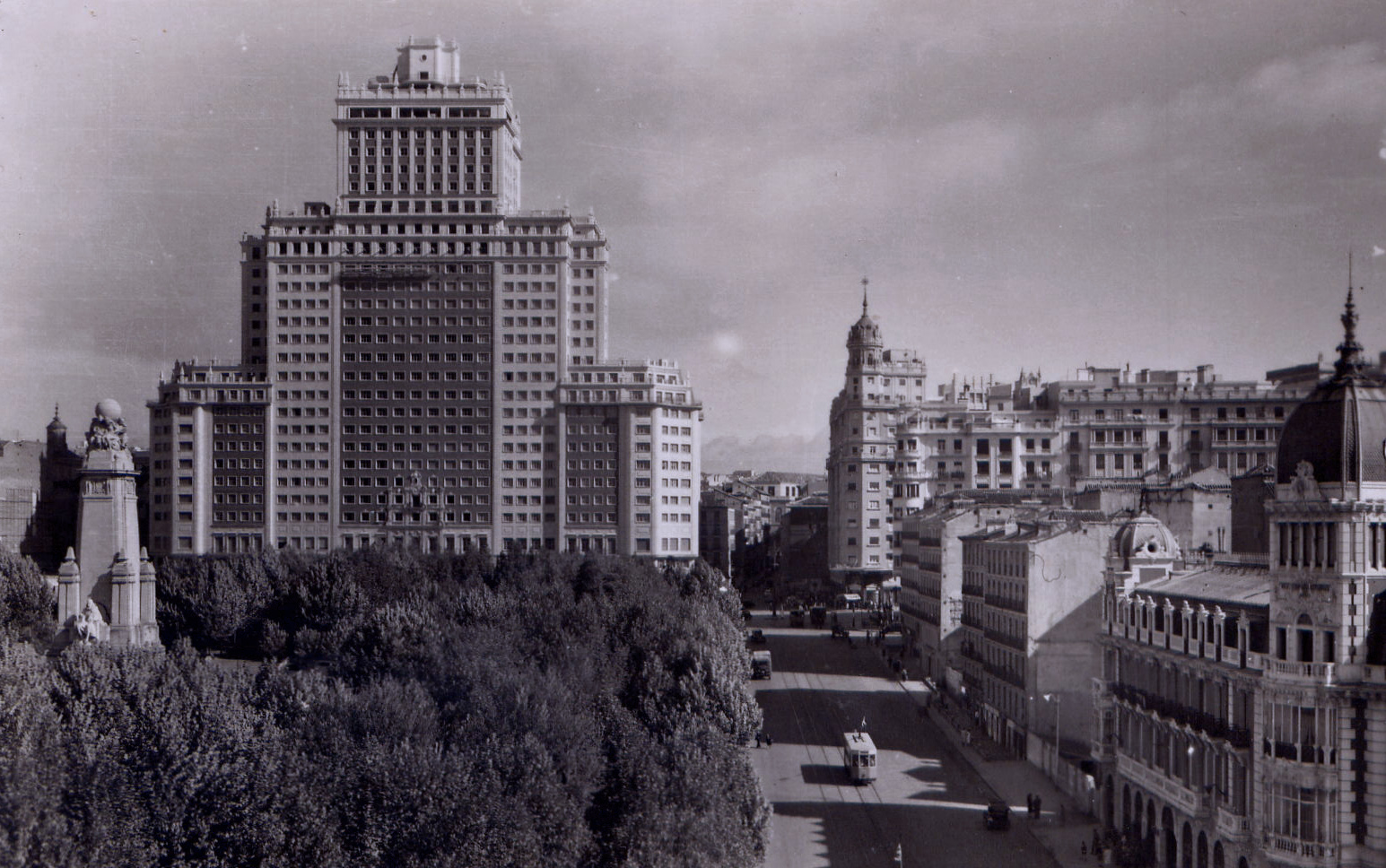
Madrid, 1950s

Elizalde did not accompany Rodezno during his 1946 visit to Don Juan and in private correspondence he dwelled upon errors of juanismo against the background of opportunism. However, the same year he co-signed a letter which in polite but firm terms asked Don Javier to terminate the regency. In 1947 he protested to Fal about a pamphlet of Melchor Ferrer, which in aggressive and venomous terms lambasted Rodezno and his pro-juanista leaning. In wake of the Law of Succession campaign Elizalde co-signed a letter to Franco, which pointed to Traditionalist monarchy as the only viable way forward. From time to time he published in El Pensamiento Navarro, trying to cultivate the Carlist identity and Traditionalist contribution to “nuestra Cruzada y la parte decisiva y heroica que en elle tomó Navarra”; in particular he continued to animate the Montejurra ascent. He went on living in Madrid and kept practicing as abogado, in the press listed e.g. as representing various legal entities engaged in juridical proceedings over mining licences; he also competed for posts in executive of the local Bar Association.

== Mid-Francoism ==
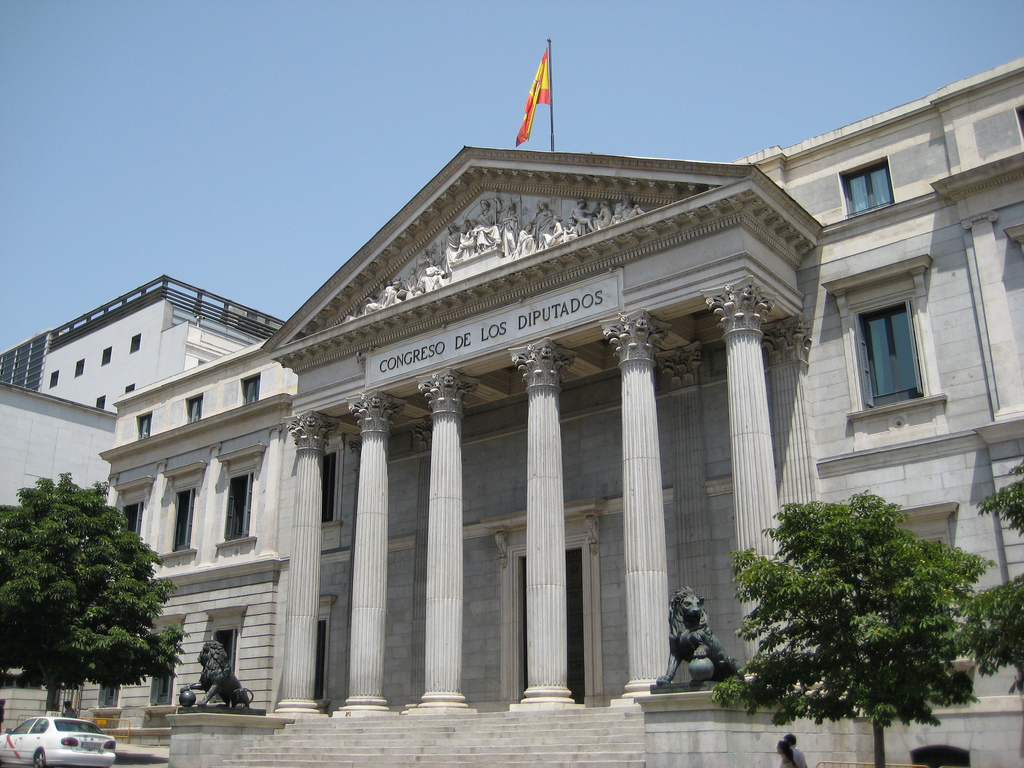
Cortes building

Though still in his mid-40s, in the early 1950s Elizalde seemed political sidetracked, inactive either in semi-clandestine Carlist structures or in the official Francoist ones. His political activity boiled down to co-signing various letters, e.g. in 1950 about Pamplona ayuntamiento's financial aid to the local Carlist circulo or in 1951 in support of Carlist candidates to the local Pamplonese elections. The first signs of change came in 1953, when he was noted during cultural events in company of vehemently pro-regime offshoot Traditionalists like Jesús Evaristo Casariego. In early 1954 he was received by Franco at a private hearing; nothing is known either about the purpose or the outcome of the meeting. Shortly afterwards he started to appear on semi-official events along the likes of Antonio Iturmendi. For the first time since his 1939 resignation from Junta Nacional, Elizalde firmly re-entered the officialdom when in 1954 Franco appointed him as member of Consejo Nacional of Falange; this in turn automatically ensured his seat in the Cortes.

The term of 6. Consejo Nacional expired in 1955, yet the same year Franco re-appointed Elizalde to the 7. National Council. This time he served the full 3-year term, working in Seccion Educación Popular; as consejero he again received the Cortes ticket in the so-called V. Legislatura, which he held until its expiry 1958. Elizalde's seat in Consejo Nacional was not prolonged in 1958 and following 4 years in somewhat decorative yet still prestigious and nominally key institutions of the Francoist state he again fell off top strata of the regime. None of the sources consulted provides any insight either into a mechanism of Elizalde's political elevation or this of his political demise. There are no details available referring to his 1954-1958 Consejo Nacional or Cortes activity. He was not noted in newspapers of the era; the only case his name appeared in the press was related to Elizalde's own article in Punta Europa, a Traditionalist periodical headed by Vícente Marrero.

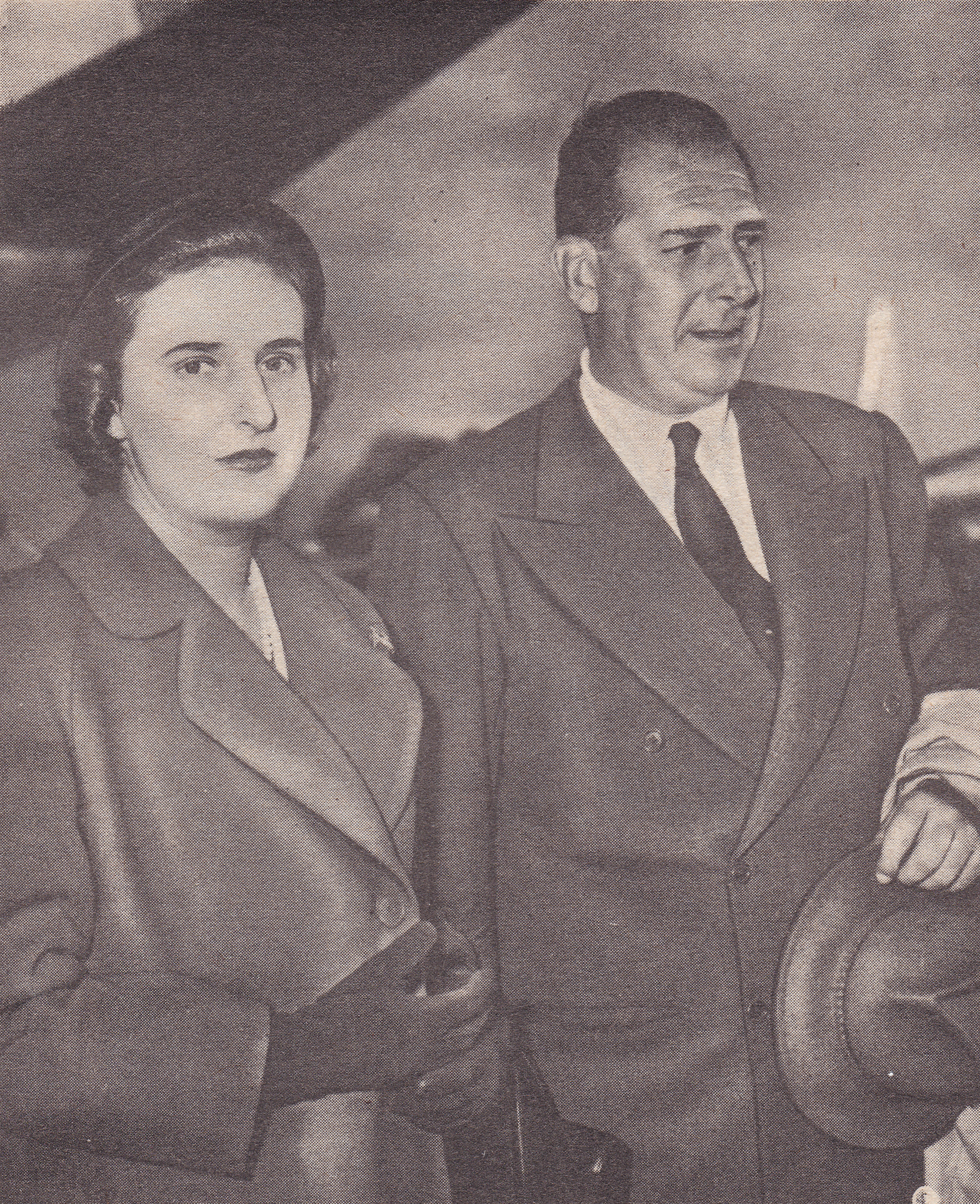
Don Juan, 1957

It is not clear whether cessation of Elizalde's Cortes career had anything to do with a so-called Acto de Estoril of 1957, when some 50 Traditionalists visited Don Juan and declared him the legitimate Carlist heir. Due to his wartime record and former position in the Navarrese executive Elizalde was among the most eminent “estorilos”; the act completed his 15-year journey to the Juanista camp and confirmed his definitive breakup with the Javierista branch of Carlism. However, it proved to have been Elizalde's political swan song. He did not enter Consejo Privado or other institutions grouping politicians from Don Juan's inner circle, and he soon disappeared from public life altogether; it is not clear whether he was marginalized or deliberately withdrew into privacy. Barely 50-year-old, he was no longer featured in the media and is not listed by historiographic works as engaged in politics, be it in the Francoist, Juanista or Carlist structures. The exception is an episode from 1967, when he briefly served as vice-president of Hermandad de Cristo Rey de Requetés Ex-Combatientes, a pro-Juanista organisation of Carlist wartime volunteers.

== See also ==
- Carlism
- Traditionalism (Spain)
- Carlo-francoism
