= José Antonio Lacayo de Briones y Palacios =

Spanish general and colonial governor

Gral. José Antonio Lacayo de Briones y Palacios
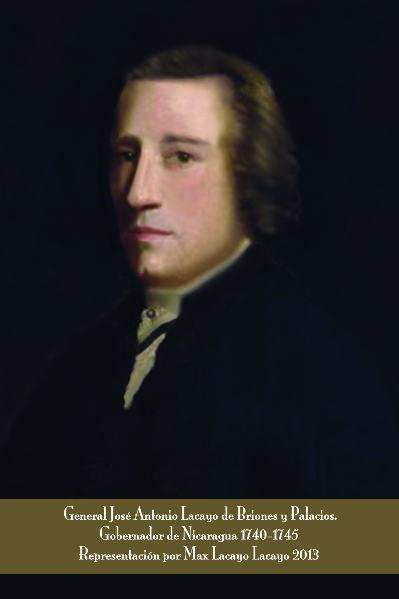
- Gral. José Antonio Lacayo de Briones y Palacios Governor of Nicaragua 1740-1745 Representation by Max Lacayo Lacayo 2013
- Born: August 13, 1679; Viana, Navarra, Kingdom of Spain
- Died: 1756 (aged 76–77); Granada, Nicaragua
- Spouse: Bárbara Rosa del Pomar y Villegas

José Antonio Lacayo de Briones y Palacios (1679–1756) was a Spanish "intendant" or "intendente" (a type of viceroyal governor) who held the position of governor in two countries in Central America during the Spanish colonial period. He was Governor of Costa Rica from 1713 to 1717 and Governor of Nicaragua from 1740 to 1745. He also held the post of Commander in Chief of the Army and strengthened the defenses of these two countries against foreign invasion.

== Spanish family origins ==
The family name Lacayo de Briones originates from the town of Briones located in the province of La Rioja. The town is close to the city of Viana in the province of Navarre, where Jose Antonio was born.

Because Lacayo de Briones held important administrative and military responsibilities in the two Central American countries he governed during Spanish colonial times, it is important to learn about the history of the regions, La Rioja and Navarre, from which his ancestral family members came, a history characterized by a constant struggle against foreign invasions and an effort to maintain order and tradition. José Antonio´s direct ancestors, as well as José Antonio himself, undoubtedly had their character moulded by this ancient history, as their high public offices in military and civilian responsibilities shows.

During the Basquisation in 1536 there were thirty Basque surnames in Briones, among which was the Lacayo last name. Possibly around that year (there is no confirmed date), Francisco Lacayo de Briones, one of José Antonio´s earliest documented ancestors, was born. He was from noble origins and his manorial house in Briones had his coat of arms carved in stone at its entrance.

Francisco married Francisca Domínguez y Rodríguez in Miranda, Navarra, where they established their home. She was also of Basque origin, being from the village of Riezu, next to the city of Estella, both places in Navarra. Several of Francisco's descendants held high public offices, usually related to maintaining order and public peace. His great grandson, Marcos Lacayo de Briones y Orive in 1651 was named Mayor of Briones' Santa Hermandad del Estado de Hijosdalgo. Santa Hermandad, literally "holy brotherhood" in Spanish, was a type of military Peacekeeping association of armed individuals, which became characteristic of municipal life in medieval Spain, especially in Castile and they were for the most part religious confraternities with a military structure and ethos. Marcos was also Regidor for the same Estado de Hijosdalgo in the city Estella in 1671.

Marcos' son, Josef Lacayo de Briones y García de Aragón, who was the father of José Antonio Lacayo de Briones y Palacios, was a Lawyer in the Reales Consejos and was also named Regidor in the Estella in 1677. On January 29, 1679, Josef became Mayor of Briones´ Santa Hermandad del Estado de los Caballeros Hijosdalgo. In 1693 and 1695, Josef was Governor and Jury of the city of Estella.

Most certainly, the services rendered by José Antonio´s direct ancestors to their regional governments and to the Crown, influenced his character and formed the basis for his distinguished and honourable performance in the high positions he held in Costa Rica and Nicaragua. The times and conditions when José Antonio served, resembled in many ways those his ancestors had to confront.

== Summary biography ==
José Antonio Lacayo de Briones y Palacios, was born into a noble family on August 13, 1679, in Viana, Navarre. He was the son of Josef Lacayo de Briones y García de Aragón and Teresa Palacios Amescua. He married Bárbara Rosa de Pomar y Villegas in 1711 in Granada, Nicaragua. Bárbara Rosa was also a native of Viana.

In about 1700, Lacayo entered the military service as a sergeant major in the service of the crown. He emigrated to Peru, then traveled to Guatemala, Nicaragua and Costa Rica. He ultimately settled in the city of Granada, Nicaragua. He became the progenitor of the Lacayo family of Nicaragua.

== Military career ==
When the Governor of Costa Rica died, then president of the Audiencia, Lorenzo Antonio de Granda y Balbín, named Lacayo as his replacement on December 11, 1712. Lacayo was, however, unable to assume his position immediately. He was preceded by two interim governors. Lacayo took office as governor on May 11, 1713.

For several years, Lacayo held the position of Treasurer of the Seal of the provinces of Nicaragua and Costa Rica. As Sergeant Major, Lacayo endured a very difficult period in the area of Cartago near the Salto river, on the Costa Rican border of Nicoya and Nicaragua. There he encountered the Mosquito, Zambos and English invaders, and attacks by ships commanded by Irish pirates.

Friar Bishop Benito Garret Arlovi accused the Sergeant Major and Mayor Lacayo de Briones of conducting illicit commerce with the English along the north coast. The Audiencia entrusted the investigation to Pedro Martinez de Ugarrio. On May 14, 1715, the Cartago municipal council and the regular and secular clergy ruled in favor of Lacayo.

Friar Pablo de Otarola, abbot of the convent of San Francisco de Cartago, certified that the statement presented by the bishop was false and added that a great infamy had been committed. On November 15, 1718, due to the accusation by the interim government Lacayo was ordered by the Audiencia to leave Costa Rica. He left Costa Rica disguised as a Franciscan friar to avoid persecution. In June 1720, the order was rescinded and Lacayo was declared an honest, pure and justified minister, worthy of his Majesty's support. He was honored with employment by the Crown and rewarded for his service.

Lacayo built the San Francisco de Esparza convent at his own expense. His previously confiscated property and the initial 2,000 ducats which he had been fined were returned.

The Audiencia indicted Lacayo's accuser, Pedro Ruiz de Bustamante, and the Church excommunicated the monks who had perjured themselves.

== Commander-in-chief of the army ==
After many years of service to the crown, in 1740 Nicaragua was attacked by Mosquitos and English General Handyse. On November 21, 1740, Lacayo was appointed governor of the province of Nicaragua. En route to León, the governor was informed of an insurrection of the mulatto Antonio Padilla, captain of the mulatto soldiers. Lacayo confronted him and sentenced him to prison and finally, condemned him to death. Since Padilla was in a chapel, there were disturbances and in the middle of the night, the governor ordered him to be clubbed. At the order of Lacayo, the mulatto Padilla was dismemberedand his head and leg were placed on public display. This was a clear message to those who did not want to obey the representatives of the crown. The governor was a very active man, conducting an inventory of all armaments and establishing quarters in León and Granada to confront the English invaders. The Audiencia reinforced the province with one hundred guns, fifty quintals of powder, six thousand bullets and other ammunition.

In spite of this, the English incursions caused terror in northern departments of the province. To deal with this, the Spanish Court responded by sending to Nicaragua 800 guns, twelve pieces of artillery, ammunition, money, one hundred soldiers of the line of Havana with officers, sergeants and artillerymen, a galley and other aid. King Felipe V ordered that they organize militias throughout the Province, and recognized the ability of Governor Lacayo by naming him Commander-in-chief of the army on May 4. 1745. With the ascent of Lacayo, he named Francisco Antonio de Caceres Molinedo as Civil Governor. The appointment of Lacayo, who was much hated in León, as the Commander-in-chief was the cause of a new secret uprising by Felipe Gamez the Master of a popular camp with the mulattos. Anticipating a new war, Lacayo was made Commanding General by Royal Decree on August 23, 1745, and permanently held the position until December 1746. These last years were the height of diplomacy, economics, and politics for the Spanish crown, during the reigns of Felipe V and his son Fernando VI.

About this time, distinguished relatives of Jose Antonio Lacayo de Briones in Viana, kingdoms of Castile and Navarre attained prominent positions in society as illustrious personages. Among them were Faustino Lacayo de Briones who studied law in Alcala and Valladolid in 1705, Jose Lacayo de Briones, lawyer of the Royal Councils of Castile and Navarre, Manuel Lacayo de Briones also a lawyer of the Royal Councils of Castile and Navarre, and Rafael Lacayo de Briones, a lieutenant and captain of the General Staff in Burgos in 1751. All these Lacayo de Briones were enabled to study through a foundation of Isabel de Bedia of nearby Logroño, a relative of the Lacayos.
