= Azuelo =

- Municipality
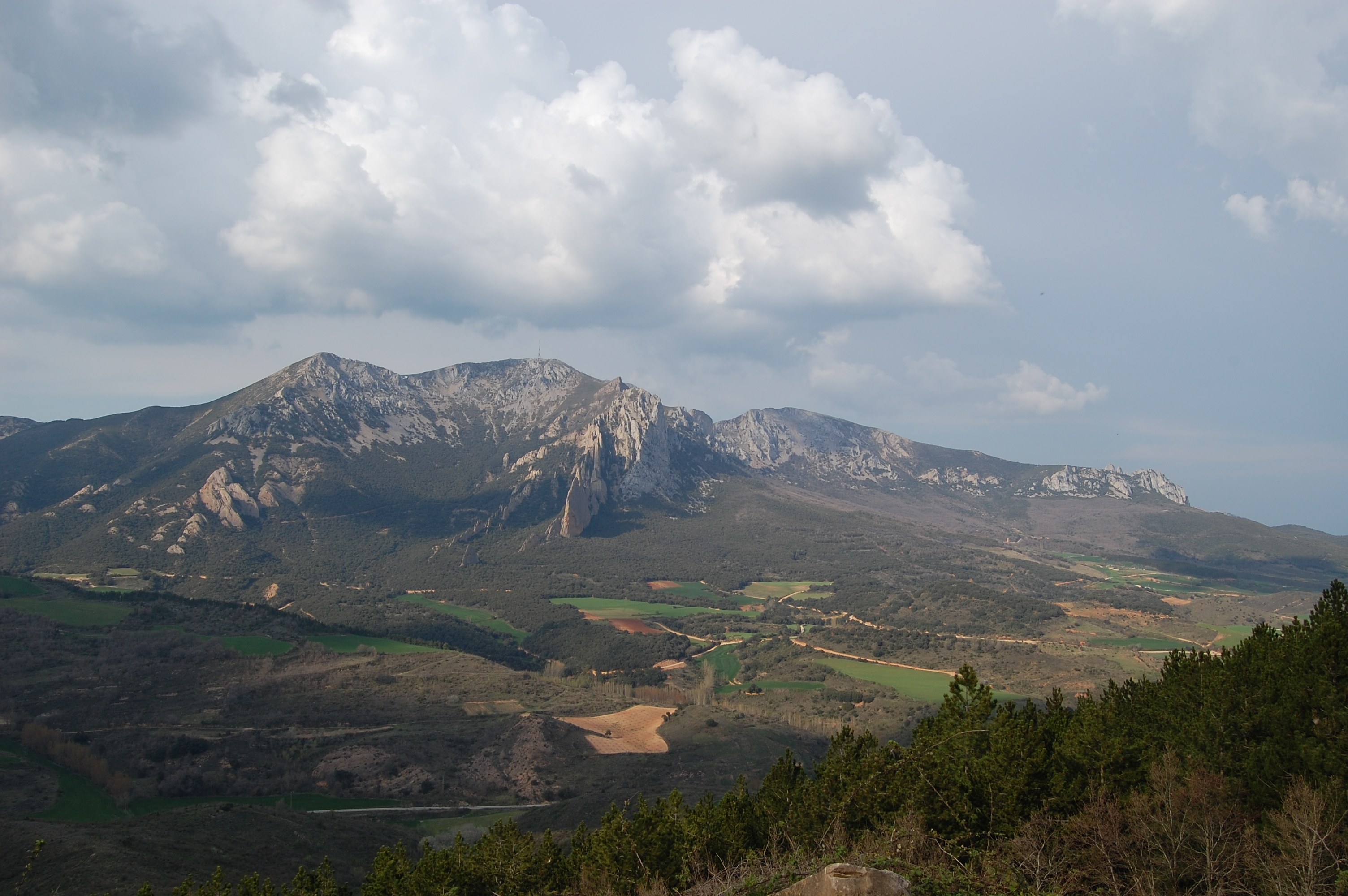

- Coat of arms

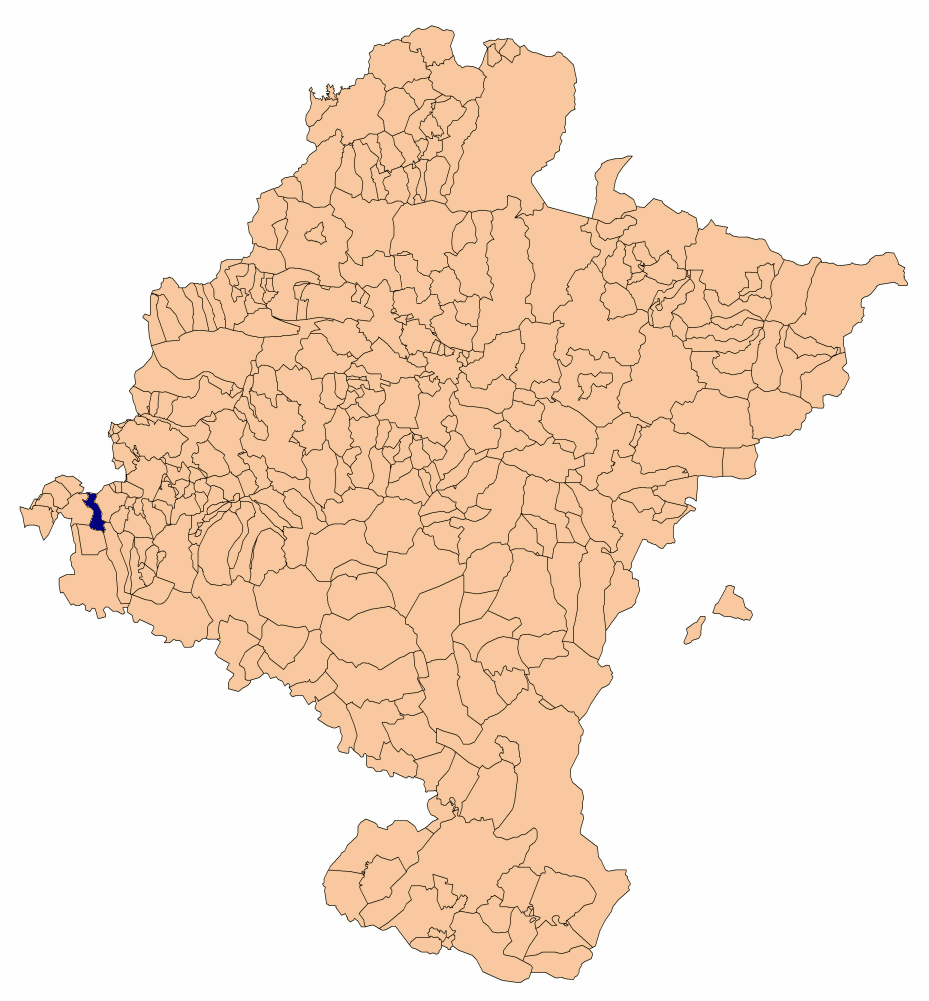
- Location in Navarre
- Coordinates: 42°36′N 2°21′W
- Country: Spain
- Autonomous Community: Navarre
- Merindad: Estella

Government
  - Mayor: Roberto Crespo

Area
  - Total: 10.5 km^{2} (4.1 sq mi)
- Elevation: 614 m (2,014 ft)

Population (2025-01-01)
  - Total: 29
  - Density: 2.8/km^{2} (7.2/sq mi)
- Time zone: UTC+1 (CET)
  - Summer (DST): UTC+2 (CEST)
- Postal code: 31228
- Official language(s): Basque, Spanish

Azuelo is a town and municipality located in the province and autonomous community of Navarre, northern Spain.

This town is close to the Codés mountain range, part of which falls within its municipal term.
