= Francisco Ureña Navas =

Spanish publisher and poet (1871–1936

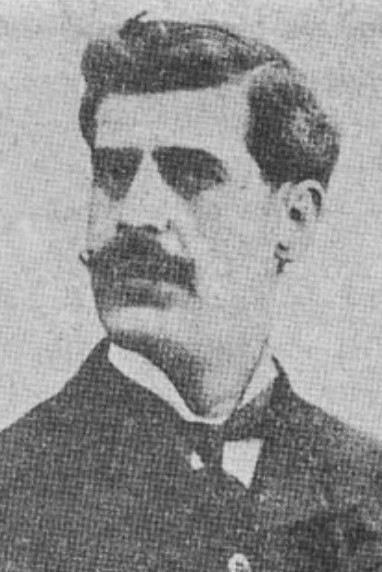
- Born: Francisco Ureña Navas; 1871; Torredonjimeno, Spain
- Died: 1936 (aged 64–65); Madrid, Spain
- Occupations: lawyer, publisher
- Known for: publisher, poet
- Political party: Integrism, Carlism

Francisco de Paula Ureña Navas (1871–1936) was a Spanish publisher and poet. He was a longtime owner and manager of the Jaén daily El Pueblo Católico (1893–1932) and animated also other, minor and short-lived provincial periodicals. He published one poetic volume, though his numerous poems were scattered across local press titles. As a poet he was recognized mostly in his native Jaén, partially thanks to his own verses and partially thanks to his role as leader of an informal poetic and cultural circle, known as "El Madroño". As a zealous Traditionalist he advanced intransigent Catholicism. Politically throughout most of his life he supported the Integrist cause, in the 1930s amalgamated in the re-united Carlist structures.

== Family and youth ==
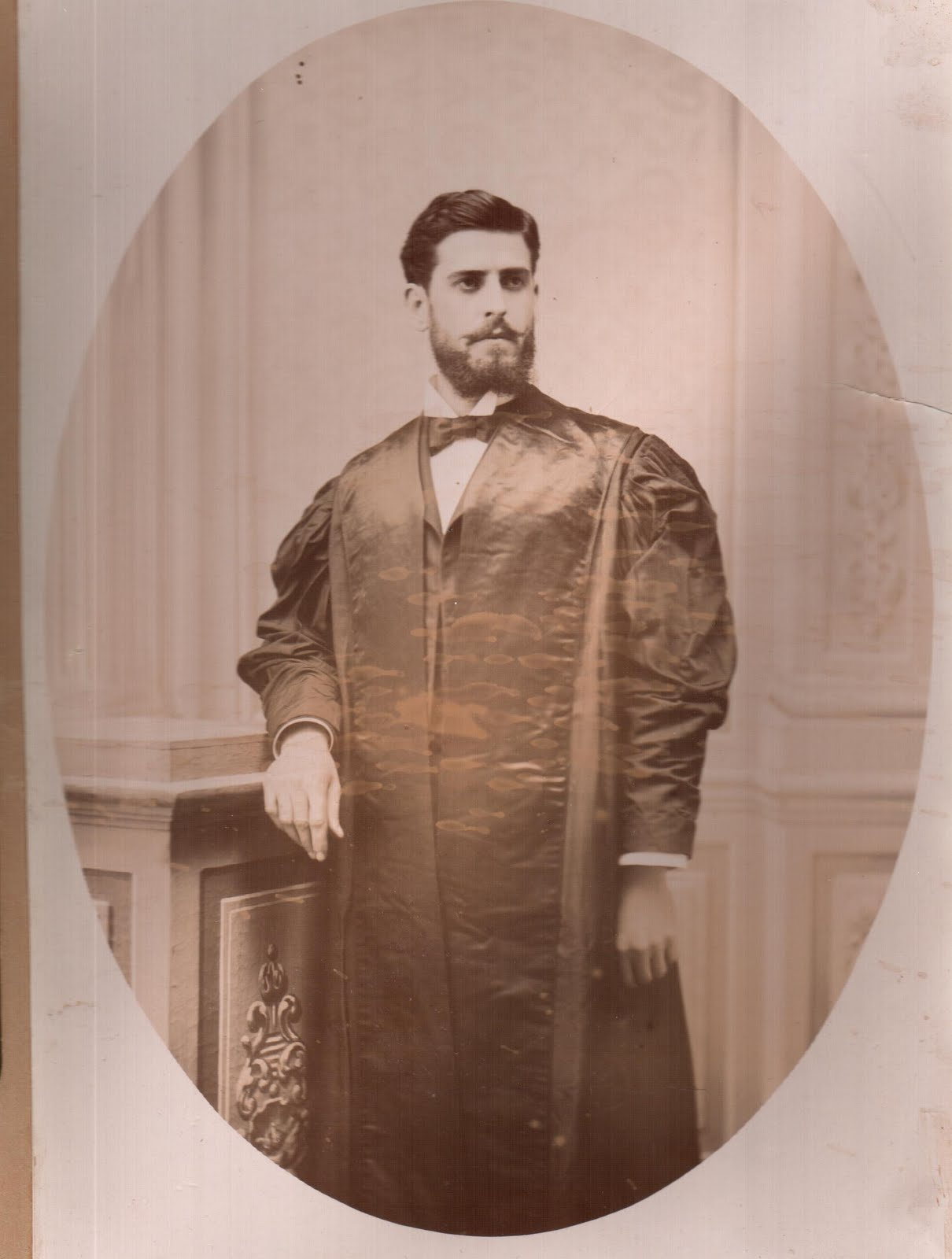
graduate

There is almost nothing known about Ureña's distant ancestors; they were of condición humilde and formed part of the east-Andalusian peasantry. His father, Juan José Ureña Ortega, was agricultural worker in Torredonjimeno, a rural municipality in the Jaén province; he married María del Rosario Navas Colomo, a girl of the same, humble status. The couple settled in Torredonjimeno. None of the sources provides information how many children they had. In his native Santa María parish Francisco was noted as a talented boy; local clergy arranged with the hierarchy that he received financial support, enabling him to commence secondary education. According to some authors he initially studied in a seminary, graduating in theology and canon law. According to others he frequented Liceo de Granada, where his master was Juan de Dios de la Rada y Delgado. At unspecified time, though probably in the mid-1880s, Ureña enrolled at the University of Seville, pursuing two paths. In law he majored as doctor, while in philosophy and letters he obtained the licenciatura; he also befriended some literary personalities, like the future director or Real Academia Española, Francisco Rodríguez Marín.

In the early 1890s Ureña returned to Jaén, where he assumed teaching duties in Colegio de Santo Tomás, the local educational establishment run by the religious. His subject was retórica, poética y literatura; one of his disciples was Antonio Alcalá Venceslada, and it was reportedly Ureña who discovered his talent. It is not clear how long he was employed in the college; the last known information listing Ureña among the teaching staff comes from the school year of 1898/1899. In 1899 he commenced work for another religious institution, namely the diocese of Jaén; he became "notario mayor", later noted as "notario eclesiástico"; this would be the position held for decades to come.

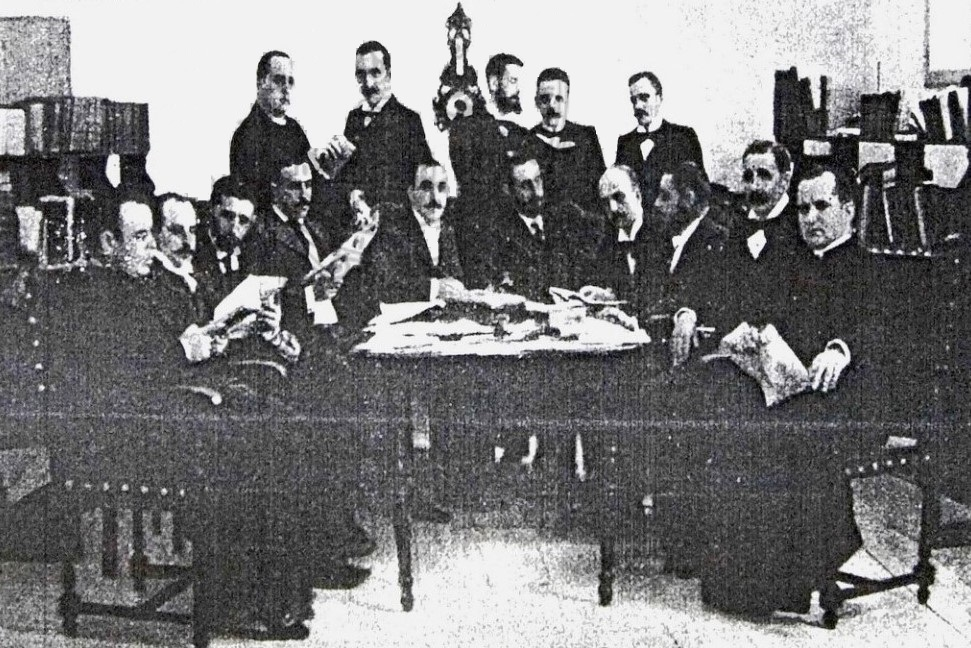
Santo Tomás teaching staff, 1898

In 1904 Ureña married Josefa Ortega de Torres, his distant relative from the Ortega family. Before he was widowed the couple had one child, María Josefa. He then re-married with Socorro Mantilla de los Ríos y Mantilla (b. 1893) from Antequera, descendant to the aristocratic Andalusian lineage which for generations has been holding the title of marqués de Casa Saavedra. Her paternal grandfather was the 8. marqués, though her father did not inherit the title and served as administrative official. None of the sources consulted provides any insight as to the background of such socially unequal marriage; they first lived in Jaén, and later at their estate El Madroño near Martos, the olive-rich municipality. In the union with Socorro Ureña had 4 sons (Francisco, José, Carlos, Juan) and 3 daughters (Socorro, Rosario and Milagros). His first daughter María Josefa died at 15 years of age in 1922, José passed away as one-year-old child in 1925. The oldest son Francisco was killed by Republican militia together with the father during early days of the war in Madrid; two remaining sons were killed by the revolutionaries in Martos. Socorro Ureña Mantilla married a Carlist politician, Jesús Elizalde y Sainz de Robles.

== Publisher ==
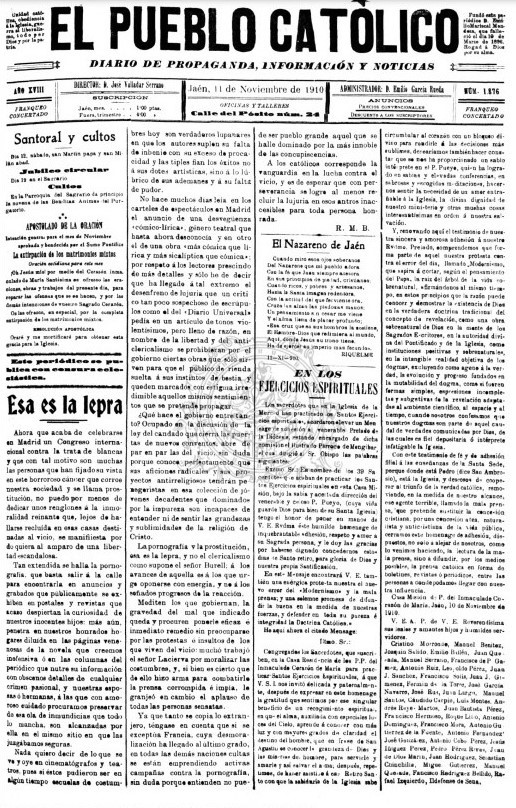
El Pueblo Católico

In 1893 Ureña was engaged in launch of El Pueblo Católico, a Jaén-based bi-weekly. According to some sources he was the key man behind the enterprise, according to others it was rather Emilio Mariscal Mendoza, who financed the launch and became the first director. Exact Ureña position in relation to El Pueblo during first decades of its lifetime is in doubt; numerous sources present him as spiritus movens, yet it remains unclear whether he was the owner or the co-owner of the title. Though the periodical bore no sub-title, it boasted of approval by ecclesiastic censorship; in terms of political line it clearly represented Integrism, the most intransigent and extreme current within Spanish Right. From the onset it adhered to ultra-Catholic unyielding standpoint, by historians categorized as "esencialmente dogmático" and marked by "extremismo". Though in 1909 it converted into a daily (according to some sources in 1910), El Pueblo remained "periódico secundario dentro del panorama periodístico" with circulation of some 1,500 copies. Periodically Ureña acted as the director, yet the holders of this role changed frequently. Despite this, the daily remained on the market and in 1917 celebrated its 25th anniversary, proud to "be faithful to the line set in 1893".

Commercially things took the turn for the better in the late 1910s, when El Pueblo "acquired solid stand"; at the time Ureña was its sole owner and again its director. In the mid-1920s the daily was selling in 3,000 copies and employed 24 people; it also grew in size from 4 to 6 pages. At the time it already "dominated the informative panorama" of Jaén and during long spells it was the only daily published in the provincial capital, at the time the 35,000-people city. The 1920s was also the period when El Pueblo - and, by this token, also Ureña - exercised the greatest influence in the province. Politically the daily retained its Integrist "increíble reaccionarismo" and lambasted the Primo dictatorship as "liberalism in disguise"; however, there were no repressive measures undertaken by the regime.

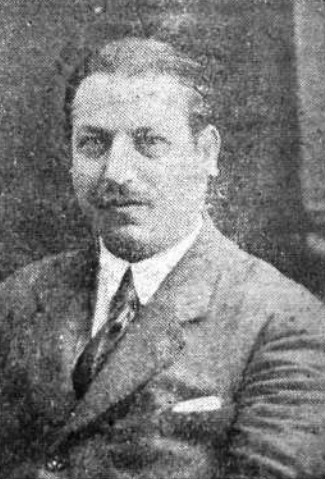
Melchor Ferrer

Things changed in 1931, following the advent of the Republic. Already in May El Pueblo was suspended for criticism of Fernando de los Ríos; another suspension came in August 1932, after the Sanjurjada. Ureña did not step back; scholars note that El Pueblo "adhered to grandiloquent tone, convinced of its exclusive ownership of truth", adopted messianic and apocalyptic features, pursued "dogmatismo a ultranza" and constantly recycled phrases about "Catholic ranks", "crusade of the lay", "sursum corda y adelante" and "Soviet tyranny". In 1932 appearance of the conservative La Mañana added to Ureña's problems, aggravated by constant conflicts with the UGT-unioned print workers. Eventually, in 1932 he sold El Pueblo to Bernardo Ruiz Cano, yet after 40 years it disappeared from the market in 1933. In 1935 the Carlist publishing house tried to resume publication, but in 1935 they settled for a new daily, Eco de Jaén; according to some sources, Ureña co-operated with the daily, managed by Melchor Ferrer.

== Poet ==
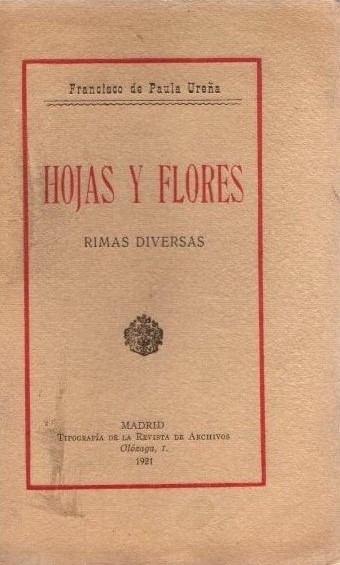
Hojas y flores

In the late 1890s Ureña was exchanging correspondence with Marcelino Menendez Pelayo, seeking his opinion and advice on own poetry and translations, but none of his works from this period is known. However, his works were present in the Integrist space, as in 1899 José Lamamie de Clairac recited Ureña's poetry in Salamanca. In 1904 he won juegos florales in Seville and the same year his poem was read at Asamblea de Buena Prensa in Madrid. Though at the time his only published works were rhymes scattered across local Catholic periodicals, in the early 1910s some referred to Ureña as "el distinguido literato" and in 1911 his poems were included in anthology, prepared by Alfredo Cazabán Laguna. In 1915 he again won juegos florales, this time in Jaén; in the late 1910s Ureña prologued literary works of other Jaén-based writers.

The first volume Ureña published was a religious drama Por fuerza del amor (Madrid 1920). Then came a collection of poetry Hojas y flores (Madrid 1921), prologued by Francisco Rodríguez Marín. The first went unnoticed, the second was acknowledged by few Madrid titles. Reviews were rather positive; one critic underlined harmony, "recia inspiración y puro casticismo" and humble but noble tone, another one stressed freshness and delicate elegance, and one more saw smooth rhyme, serene tone, delicacy and color. However, there was no follow up; since then Ureña presented his poetry only in local and national periodicals or during cultural events, e.g. during a 1923 fiesta literaria in Seville, where every Andalusian province was represented by one poet; he stood for Jaén.

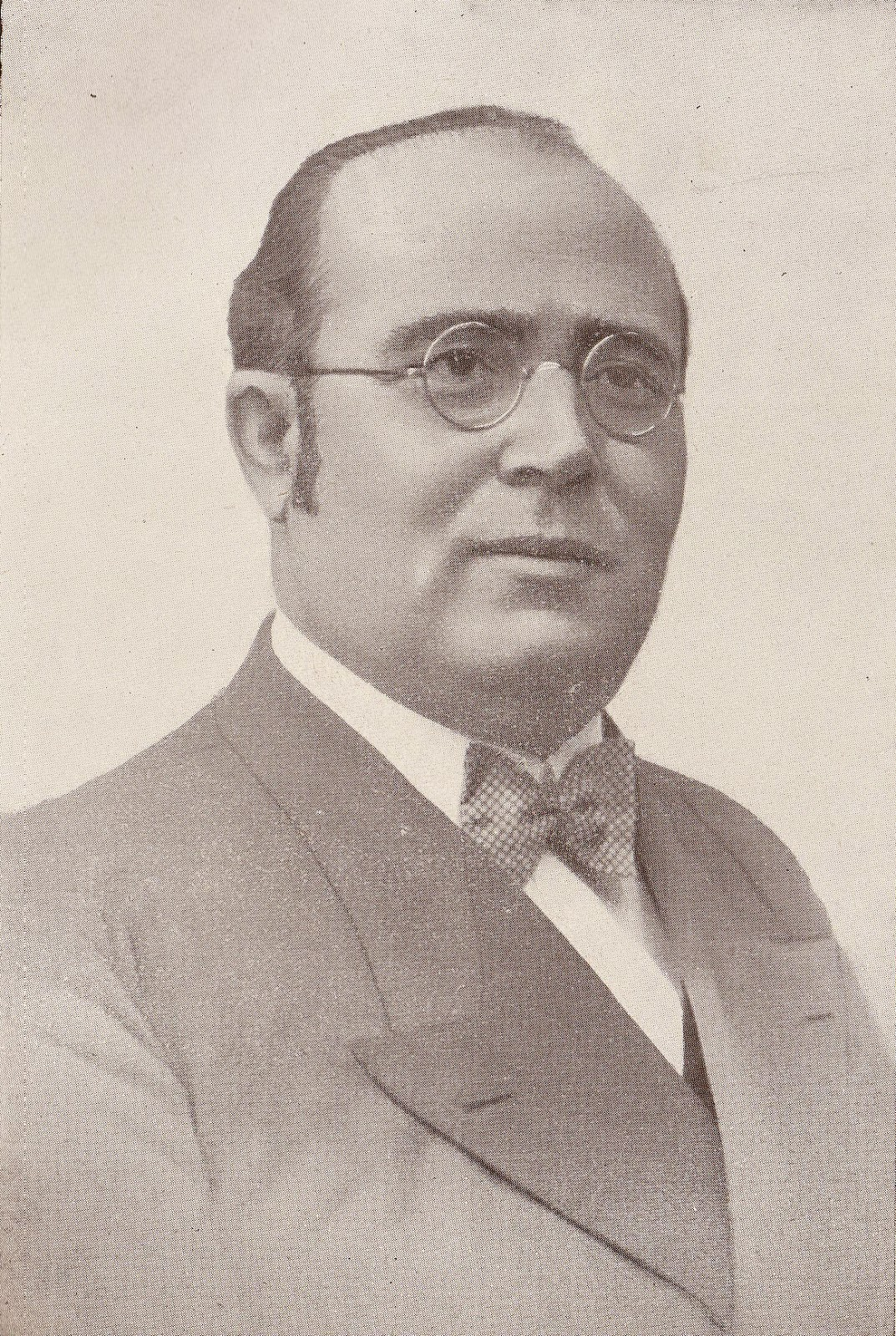
Luis Carpio Moraga

Though a poet himself, Ureña is also known as the moving spirit behind a circle of local poets, who met at literary evenings in his rural residence and after its name became informally known as grupo literario El Madroño. Ureña emerged as their leader and sort of a mentor, especially that most were much younger: Luis Carpio Moraga (b. 1884), Francisco Blanco Nájera (b. 1889), Vicente Montuno Morente (b. 1898), Manuel Mozas Mesa (b. 1898) and Bernardo Ruiz Cano (b. 1909). He prologued some of their publications. It is due to his own production and influence on others - especially that some would emerge as notable figures in the world of Spanish literature - that Ureña is dubbed "un nombre importante en el panorama poético [of Jaén] del primer tercio del siglo XX".

Ureña's poetry did not make it to history of Spanish literature and he is absent in all literary encyclopedias or dictionaries, except these dedicated to Andalusia or Jaén; he earned one monographic article and might be mentioned en passant in broader works. His poetry - and to some extent also this of the "El Madroño" - is described as deliberately anti-modern, as they remained "enemigos encarnizados del modernismo" who "pugnaban pacifícamente" against new styles and motives. He remained on purpose and against all odds traditional; saturation with patriotic, historic and especially Catholic threads was intended as counter-proposal to "modelos modernos" of literature.

== Activist, official ==
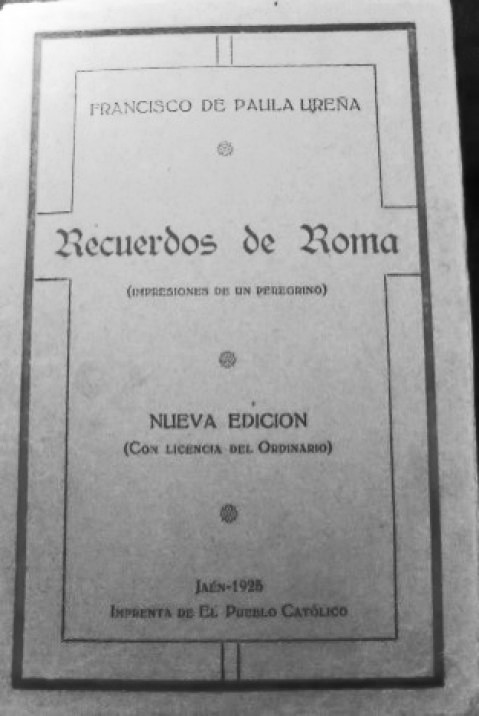
Recuerdos de Roma

Across decades Ureña remained active animating various cultural events, organizations, and institutions in Jaén. The first such case was recorded in 1894, when he co-organized a workers' pilgrimage to Rome; he would later issue recollections from Italy in the last volume he published, Recuerdos de Roma (1925); it was printed by his daily El Pueblo Catolico. Similar social flavor marked his activity in Sociedad católico-literaria de Amigos de los pobres in Torredonjimeno, operational in the mid-1890s. At the turn of centuries he co-managed Ateneo Escolar Científico y Literario in Jaén; unlike most Ateneos in Spain, which propagated the liberal blueprint, this one remained zealously Catholic. In the 1910s and 1920s he took part in events organized by local Catholic organizations, like Juventud Católica. Ureña was noted as "asiduo colaborador" of the Jaén cultural magazine, Don Lope de Sosa. Also, in the 1920s he co-launched two more periodicals, La Provincia in Úbeda and El Eco Marteño in Martos, though both proved short-lived. Ureña's activities nationwide were usually related to so-called buena prensa, the association of Catholic newspapers and periodicals promoted by the hierarchy and aimed against the liberal press. In 1924 and as socio protector he took part in Asamblea de Prensa Católica in Toledo. He became a member-correspondent of the Real Academia Española de la Lengua, yet neither the entry date nor the work which gained him entry are known; it might have been related to his loose translations of ancient authors (e.g. Horace) from Latin.

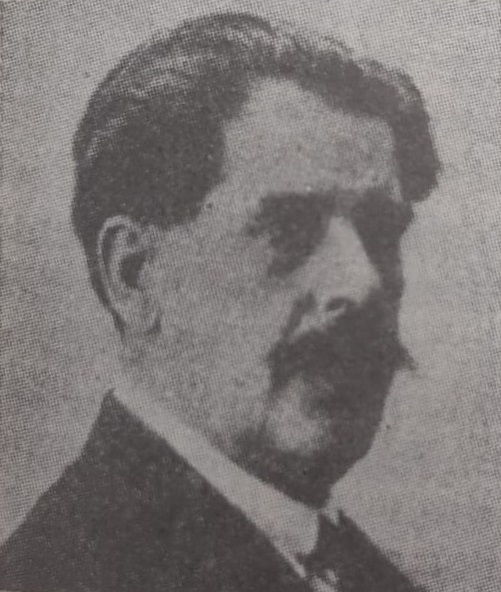
in his 40s

Since the early 20th century Ureña was listed among "mayores contribuyentes", major taxpayers, in Martos; in 1909 he became a lay judge in Partido Judicial de Martos. Since the 1910s as a lawyer he kept performing various clerk jobs in the Martos ayuntamiento, including also in juridical proceedings; such cases are recorded throughout the 1920s. Since the early 1910s and on the on-and-off basis he served also as councilor in the Martos town hall. In 1923 he was nominated hijo adoptivo of Jaén, the honor conferred upon him during a ceremony in the El Madroño estate. it would soon turn into Ureña's only residence, as in 1927 he sold his house in Jaén, purchased by the council to be turned into a post office. In 1927 Ureña was nominated president of the Jaén provincial Tribunal Tutelar para Niños, a corrective institution for juvenile offenders set up by Ministerio de Gracia y Justicia, and in this role he was recorded until the fall of the dictatorship. Apart from having been noted on societé columns, in the local press he was also mentioned as active co-organizing homages to locally recognized personalities, assuming various minor official jobs in the ayuntamiento, or performing auxiliary juridical roles during dictablanda in 1930. During local elections of April 1931, which eventually triggered collapse of the monarchy and the advent of the Republic, he fielded his candidature but failed to renew his self-government ticket.

== Politician ==
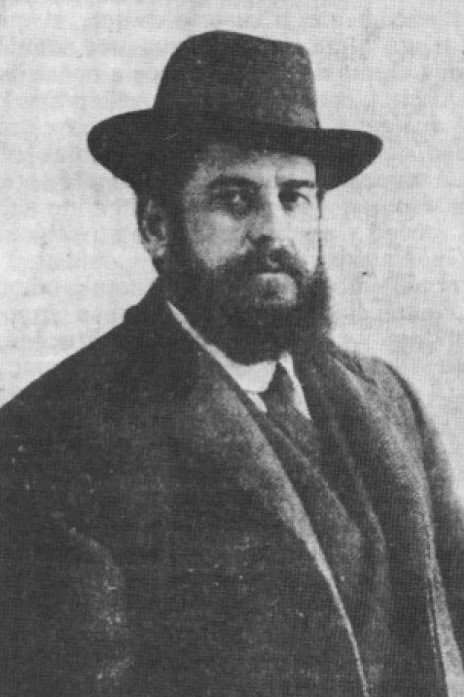
in his 50s

Ureña's ascendants were Carlists, by no means unusual following among peasant population in Torredonjimeno; Francisco inherited Traditionalist outlook. It is unclear whether during the 1888 breakup, which produced emergence of the Integrists, it was his father or the 17-year-old Ureña he opted for the breakaways; in Torredonjimeno their leader was Juan Montijano Molina. In the 1890s Ureña was signing open letters, published in the chief Integrist daily El Siglo Futuro, and El Pueblo Católico adhered to most strict Integrist line. At the time local Jaén Integrists and Carlists were bitter enemies; the latter complained that their daily, El Norte, failed due to "conspiración íntegro-conservadora". Later during the decade he used to take part in rallies hailing the Integrist leader Ramón Nocedal, e.g. in 1899 in Seville, yet none of the sources consulted provides information on him holding formal roles in Integrist party structures, be it in Jaén or Andalusia. Seldom his poems appeared in El Siglo Futuro.

Following the end of liberal democracy and institutionalization of the Primo dictatorship Ureña retained low political profile. In the mid- and late 1920s he was at times mentioned by the primoderiverista bulletin Patria, issued in Jaén; he featured as engaged in various initiatives of Unión Patriótica, yet there is no confirmation he joined either UP or Somatén himself. Though Integrism remained mostly accidentalist, he demonstrated some monarchist sympathies. In 1930 he represented the province of Jaén in nationwide Integrist structures, re-born after the fall of Primo. Shortly before collapse of the monarchy, in April 1931, he appeared at public rallies of Acción Católica, yet it is not clear whether in local elections he ran for the ayuntamiento on the list of AC or this of any other organization.

Carlist standard

In 1931-1932 and following 44 years of secession (1888-1932), the Integrists re-united with Carlism in the mainstream Traditionalist organization, Comunión Tradicionalista. At the time Ureña was just selling El Pueblo Católico and the daily did not have the chance to speak either for or against the merger. In 1933 he was assaulted when driving a car from Jaén to El Madroño; the stone hit him in the face and he had to undergo medical treatment; initially papers speculated that it was a non-political case of vandalism, but later it was taken as a mark of growing social tension in Martos. In 1934 he was already aligned within the Carlist framework, e.g. he took part in religious service in Madrid held for the soul of Marcelino Oreja, the Carlist killed during the October 1934 revolution. In 1935 he represented the Carlists in Bloque Nacional, a monarchist alliance, and presided over its provincial Junta Directiva in Jaén, with Melchor Ferrer another Carlist member of the body. It is not clear why he was in Madrid during the July coup of 1936; he was made to dig his own grave before declaring ¡Viva Cristo Rey! when shot together with his son. His estate was expropriated few weeks later.

== See also ==
- Integrism
- Traditionalism
- Carlism
- Carlism in literature
