= Armañanzas =

Coordinates: 42°33′36″N 2°17′06″W

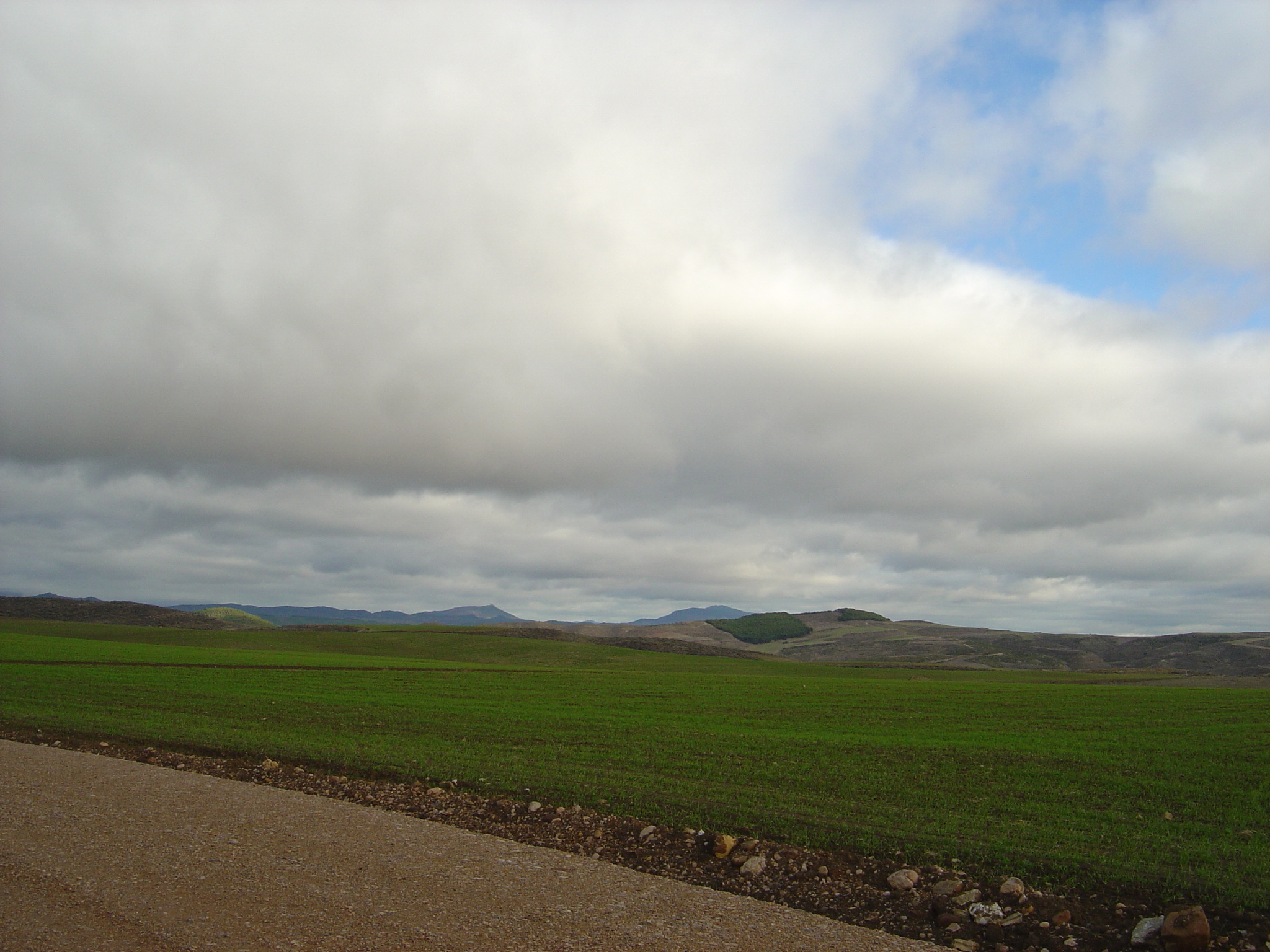

- Flag Coat of arms
- Interactive map of Armañanzas
- Country: Spain
- Autonomous community: Navarre

Area
  - Total: 12.38 km^{2} (4.78 sq mi)
- Elevation: 489 m (1,604 ft)
- Postal code: 31228
- Area code: 948
- Website: www.armananzas.es

Armañanzas is a town and municipality located in the province and autonomous community of Navarre, northern Spain.
