= Piedramillera =

Town in Spain

Coordinates: 42°37′58″N 2°12′10″W

- Town
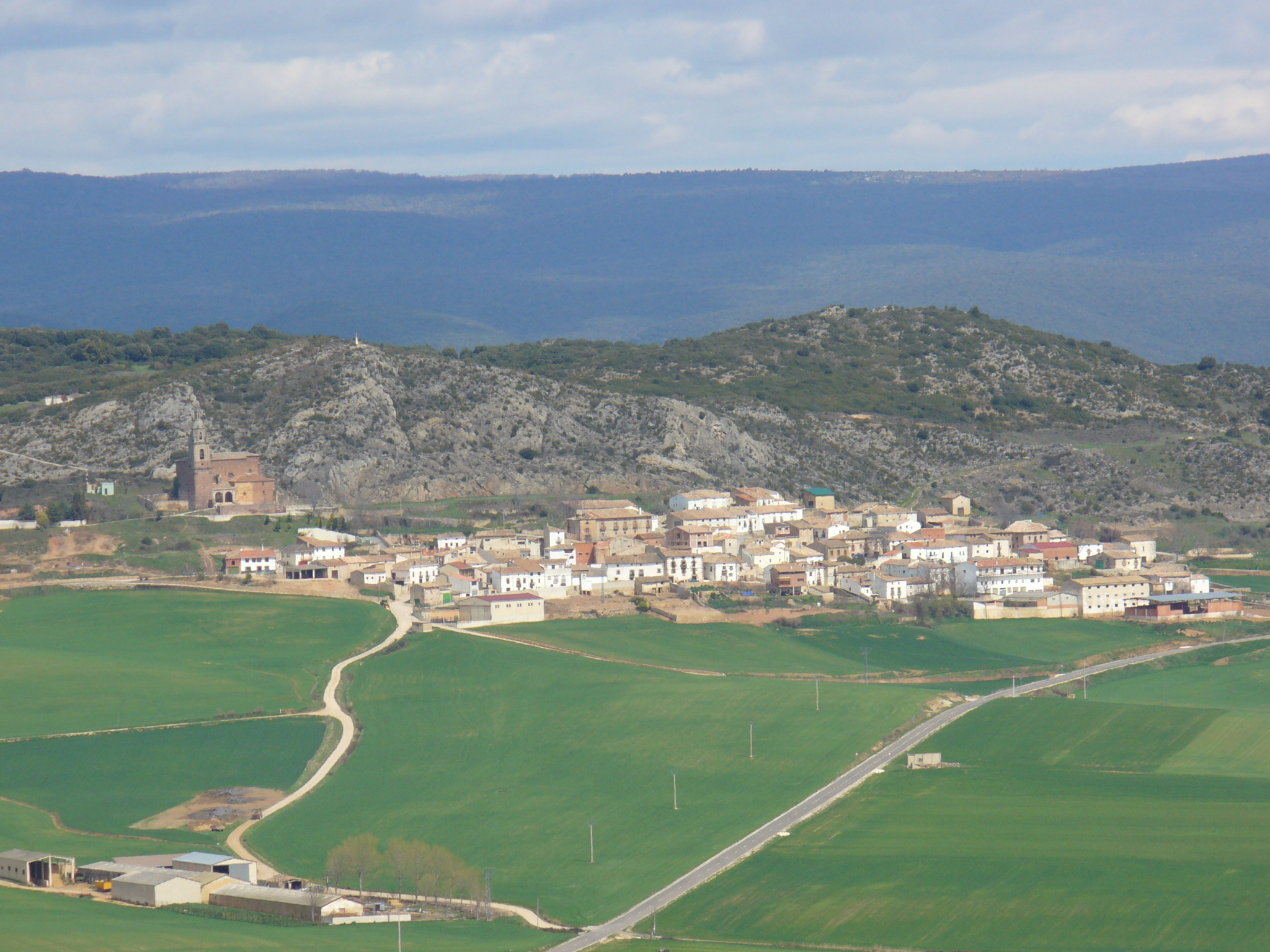
- Piedramillera plateau in Navarre

- Coat of arms

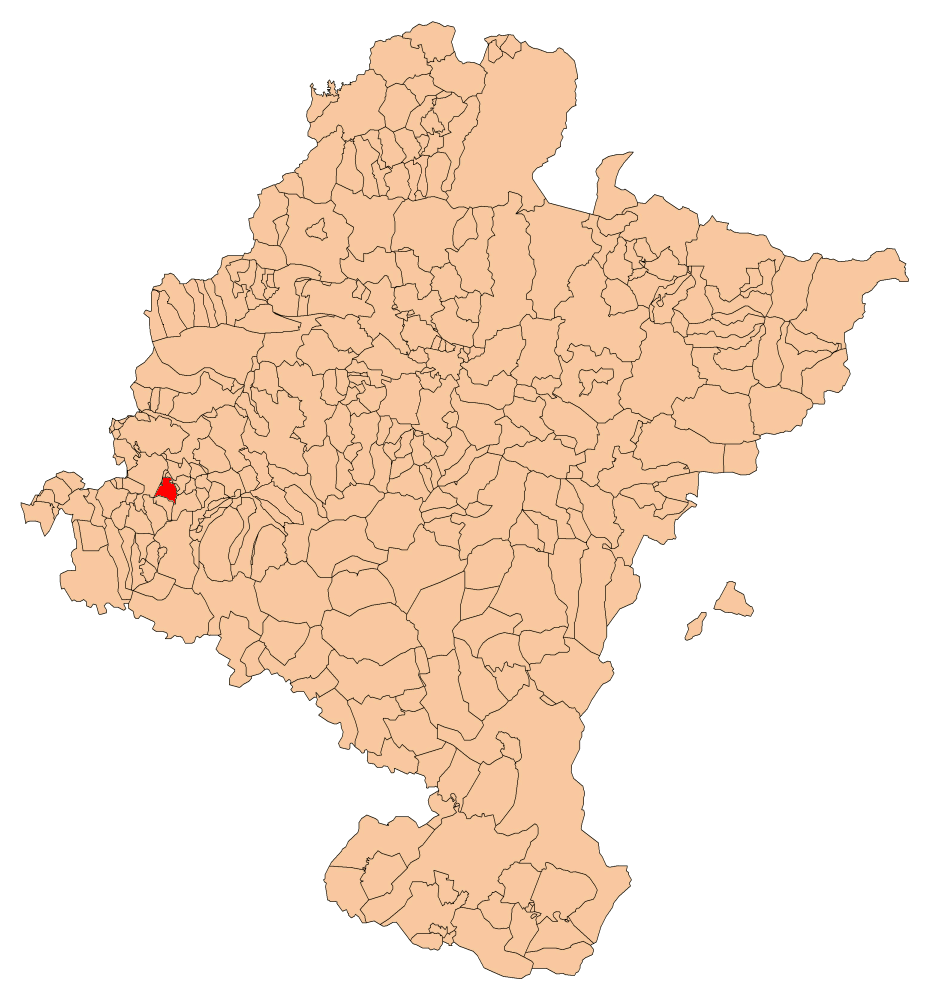
- Map of Piedramillera

Piedramillera is a town and municipality located in the province and autonomous community of Navarre, Northern Spain.
