= Viana, Spain =

Coordinates: 42°30′54″N 2°22′20″W

Viana
- Town and municipality
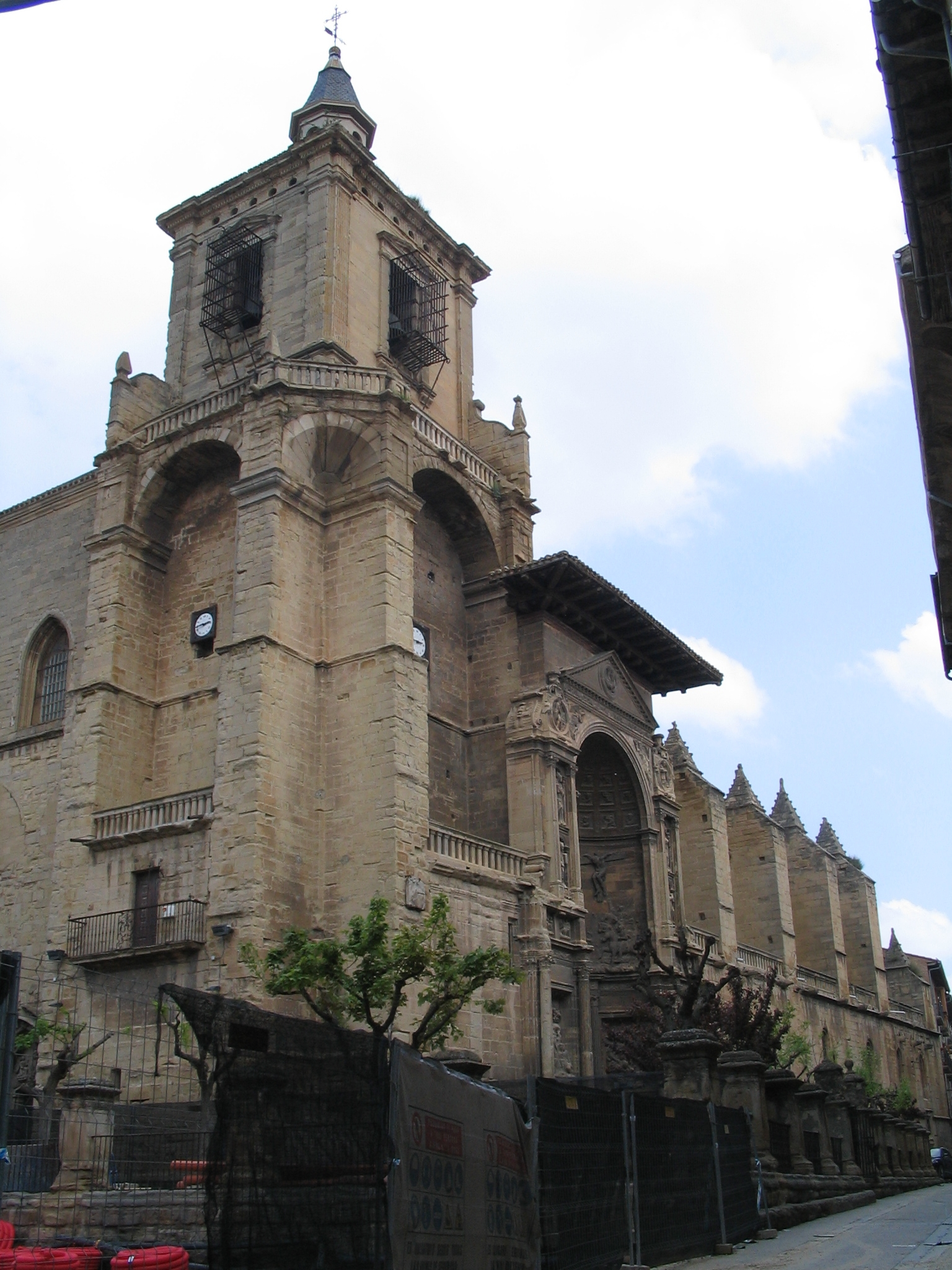
- The main church in Viana, Navarra

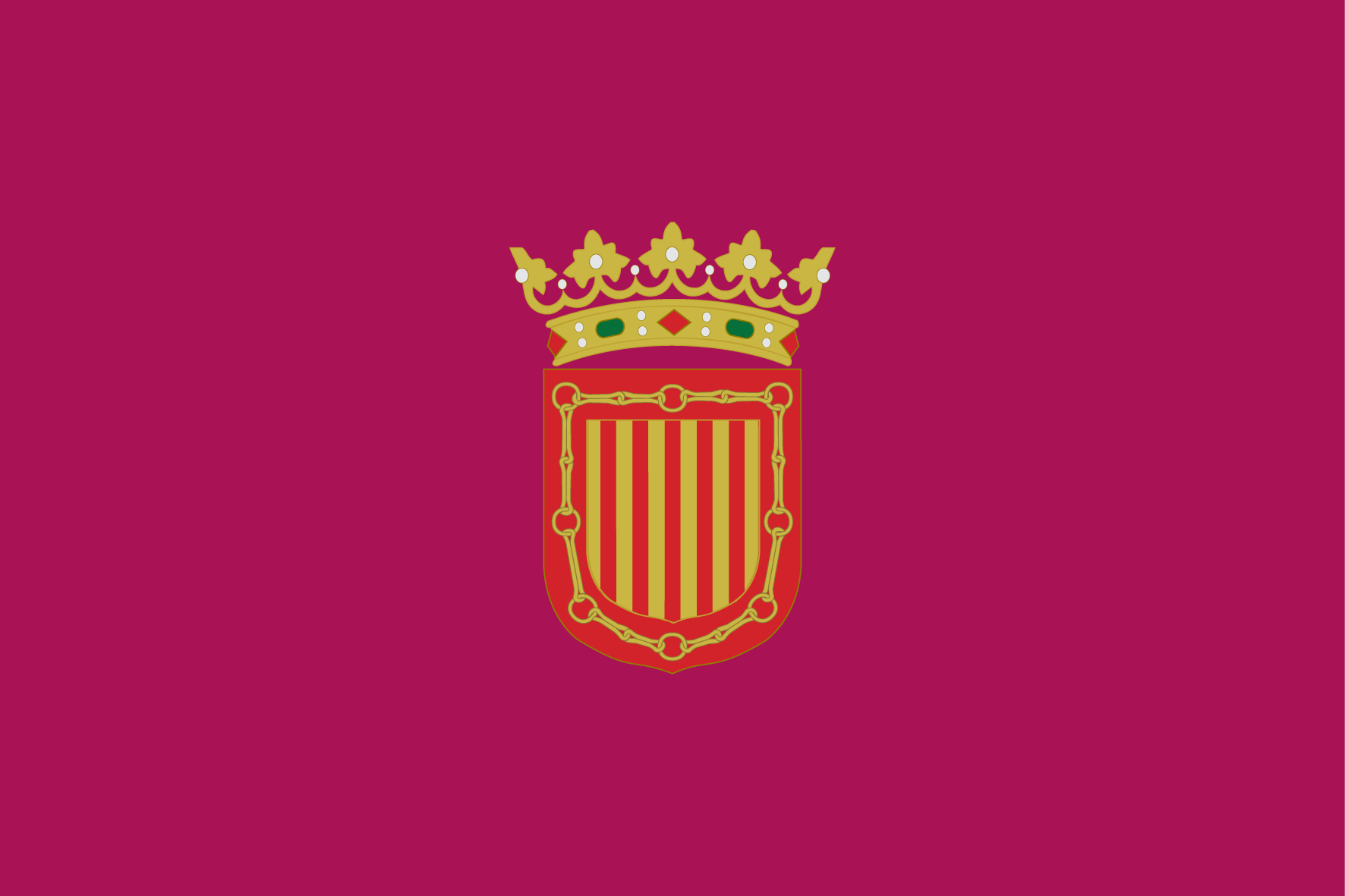
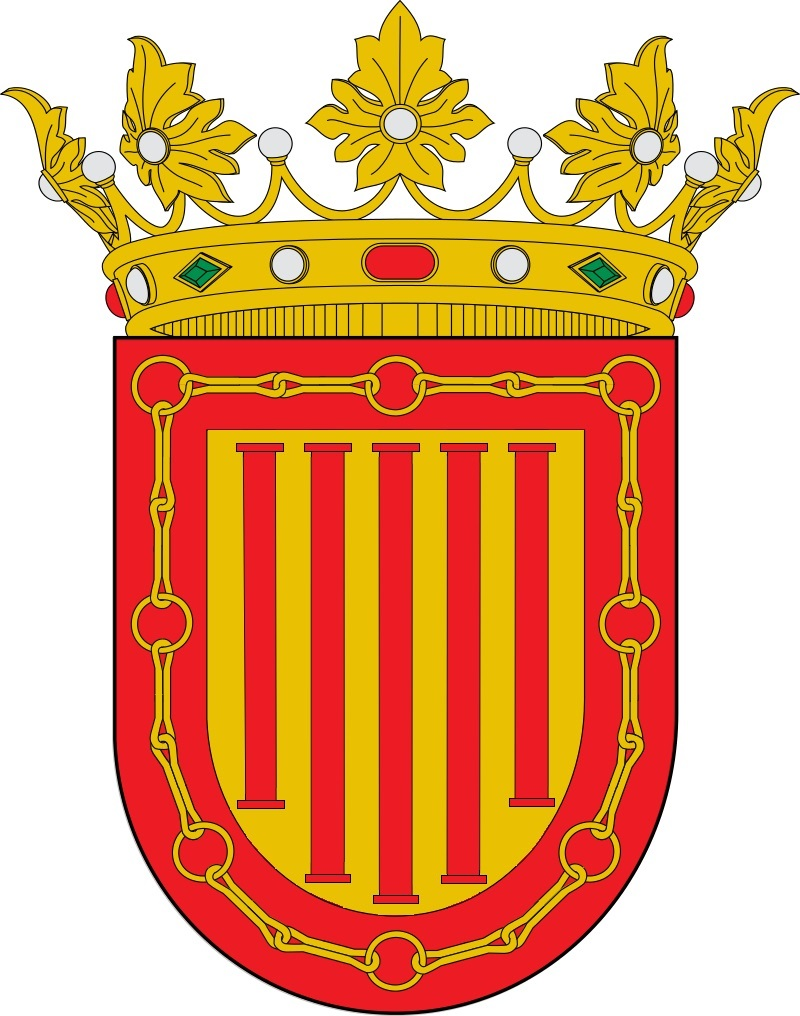
- Flag Coat of arms
- Interactive map of Viana
- Country: Spain
- Community: Navarre
- Merindad: Estellerria
- Comarca: Estella Occidental

Government
  - Mayor: José Luis Murguiondo (Socialist Party of Navarre)

Area
  - Total: 78.62 km^{2} (30.36 sq mi)
- Elevation: 469 m (1,539 ft)

Population (2025-01-01)
  - Total: 4,441
  - Density: 56.49/km^{2} (146.3/sq mi)
- Demonym(s): Basque: vianar Spanish:vianés, -a
- Postal code: 31230

Viana is a town and municipality located in the province and autonomous community of Navarre, northern Spain. Cesare Borgia is buried there, having been killed during the siege of Viana in 1507.

Viana is on the French Way path of the Camino de Santiago.

== Demography ==
Historical population

| Year | Pop. | ±% |
|---|---|---|
| 1900 | 2,920 | — |
| 1910 | 3,055 | +4.6% |
| 1920 | 2,926 | −4.2% |
| 1930 | 2,922 | −0.1% |

| Year | Pop. | ±% |
|---|---|---|
| 1940 | 2,773 | −5.1% |
| 1950 | 2,881 | +3.9% |
| 1960 | 2,682 | −6.9% |
| 1970 | 3,117 | +16.2% |

| Year | Pop. | ±% |
|---|---|---|
| 1981 | 3,413 | +9.5% |
| 1991 | 3,365 | −1.4% |
| 2001 | 3,425 | +1.8% |
| 2017 | 4,078 | +19.1% |

Population according to the census

== Notable people ==
- Juan Vélaz de Medrano, founder of the oldest hereditary mayorazgo in Viana in 1437, the Vélaz de Medrano majorat.
- José Antonio Lacayo de Briones y Palacios, born there in 1679, was Governor of Costa Rica (1713 to 1717) and Nicaragua (1740 to 1745) during Spanish colonial times.
- Francisco Gonzalez de Ibarra, a missionary active in Southern California between 1820 and 1840, was a native of Viana, born there in 1782.
- Jesús Elizalde Sainz de Robles (1907-1980), Carlist politician

== See also ==
- Prince of Viana
