= Aguilar de Codés =

Aguilar de Codés Aguilar Kodes (Basque)
- Municipality
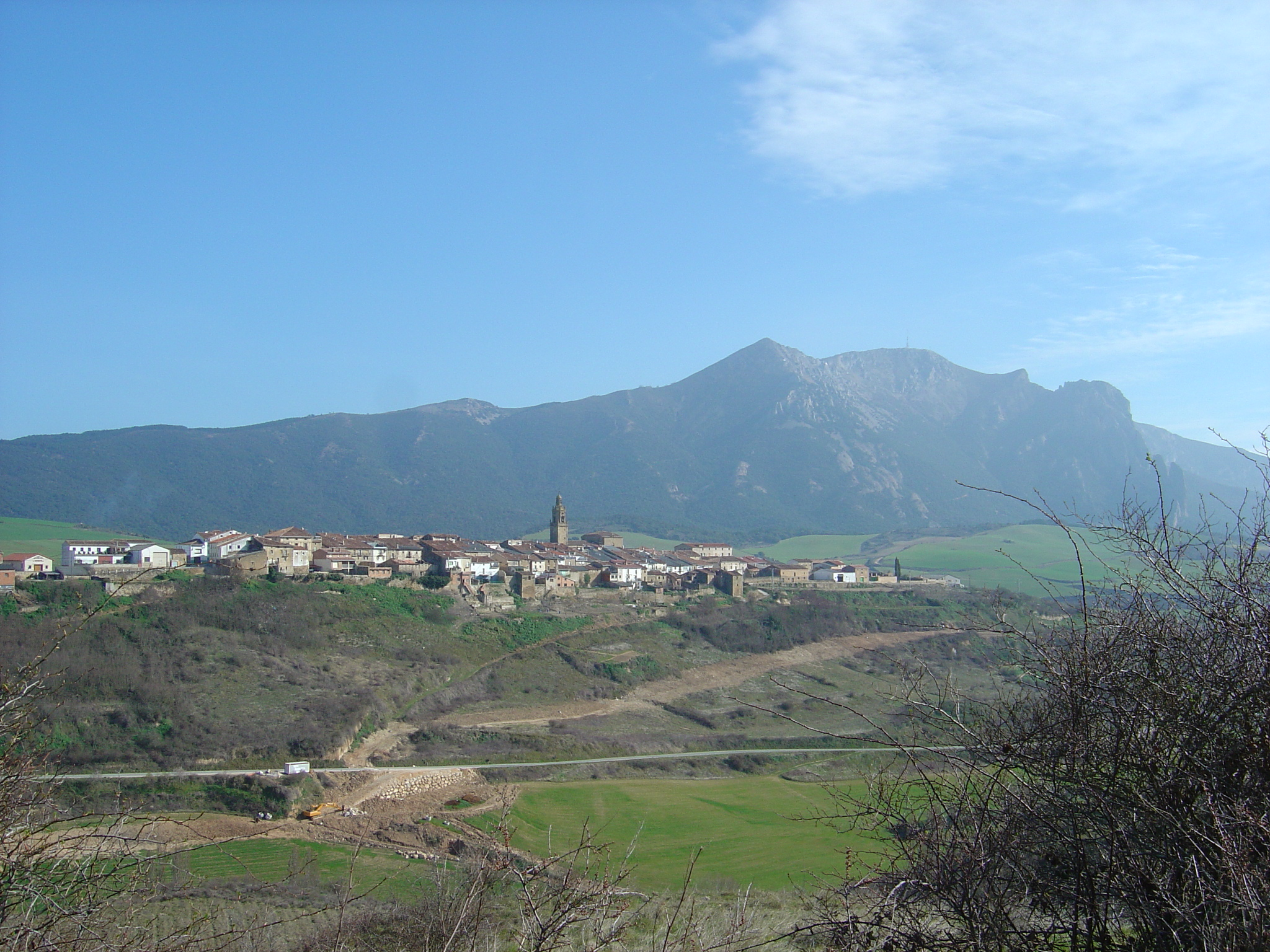
- View of Aguilar de Codés with the Sierra de Codés in the background.

- Coat of arms

- Location in Navarre
- Coordinates: 42°36′46″N 2°23′21″W
- Country: Spain
- Autonomous Community: Navarre
- Merindad: Estella Occidental
- Founded: 1219 by Sancho VII of Navarre

Government
  - Mayoress: Amparo Labeaga Díaz de Cerio (indep.)

Area
  - Total: 18.16 km^{2} (7.01 sq mi)
- Elevation: 731 m (2,398 ft)

Population (2025-01-01)
  - Total: 74
  - Density: 4.1/km^{2} (11/sq mi)
- Time zone: UTC+1 (CET)
  - Summer (DST): UTC+2 (CEST)
- Postal code: 31228
- Official language(s): Basque, Spanish

Aguilar de Codés (Basque: Aguilar Kodes) is a town and municipality located in the province and autonomous community of Navarra, northern Spain. The name "Codés" comes from neighboring Sierra de Codés, that closes the northern end of the valley where Aguilar lies.
