= Sierra de Kodes =

Mountain range of the Basque Mountains, Spain

Kodes Range
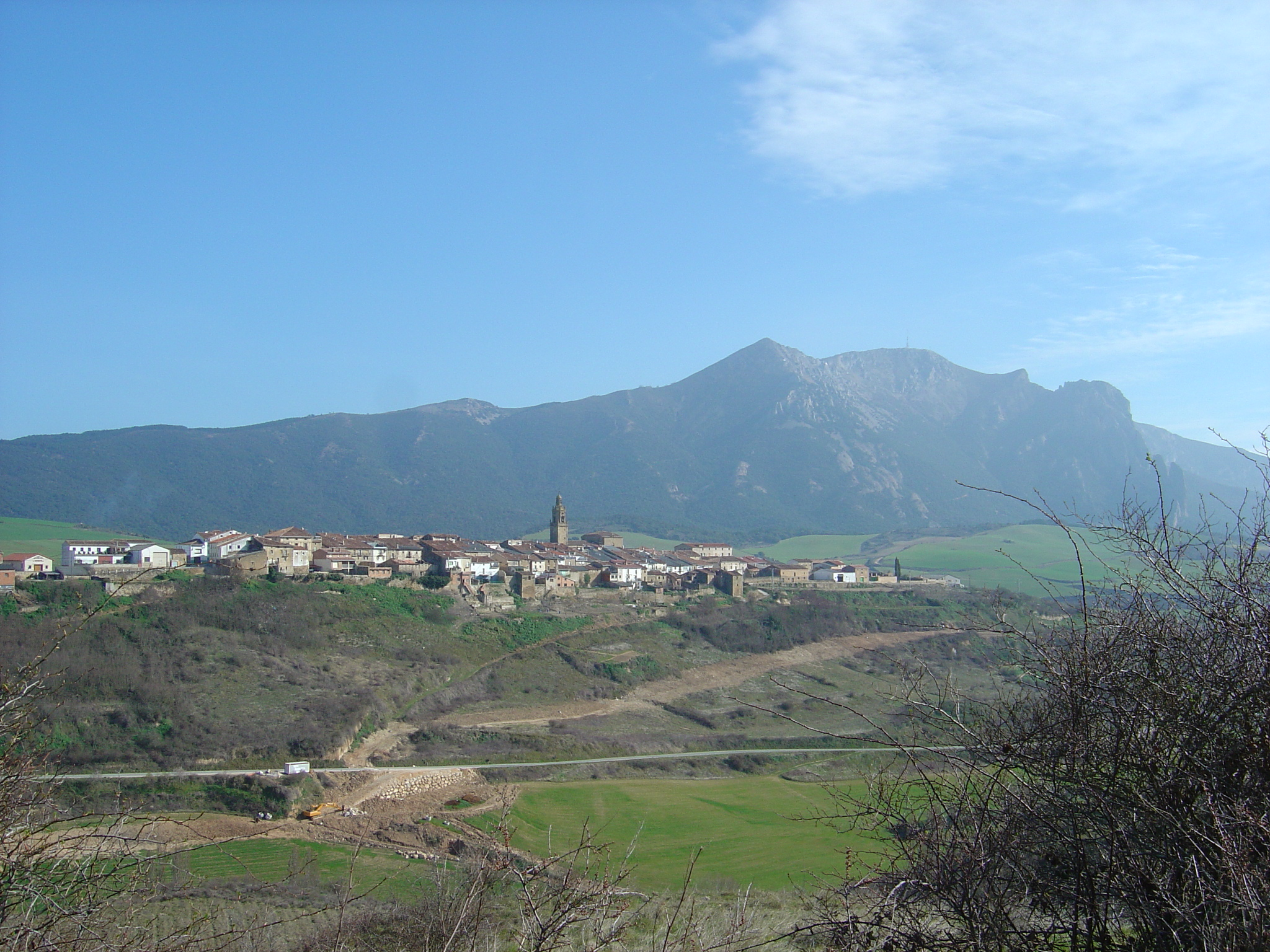
- Kodes range rising behind Aguilar de Codés

Highest point
- Elevation: 1,418 m (4,652 ft)
- Coordinates: 42°38′0″N 2°21′15″W

Naming
- Language of name: Basque

Geography
- Location: Navarre, Spain
- Parent range: Basque Mountains

Climbing
- First ascent: unknown
- Easiest route: climb

The Kodes Range (Kodesko mendilerroa in Basque and Sierra de Kodes in Spanish) is a mountain range of western Navarre, Spain, part of the Basque Mountains. Its highest point is the 1,418-metre-high Ioar, located between Santa Cruz de Campezo and Aguilar de Codés. The Codés Range is the westernmost mountain range in Navarre, located right at the limit of Álava Province.

The Santuario de Nuestra Señora de Codés is located in this mountain range, within the Torralba del Río municipal term.

Together with the neighboring Andia and Urbasa ranges further north, Kodes summits are usually covered in snow in the winter.

== Summits ==
- Ioar, 1,418 m
- Kodes, 1,414 m
- Grudo, 1,363 m
- Laplana, 1,337 m
- Peña Blanca, 1,249 m
- San Cristobal, 1,245 m
- Costalera, 1,234 m
- Peña Redonda, 1,207 m
- Peña Gallet, 1,158 m
- Humada, 1,155 m
- Malpica, 1,087 m
- La Corolla, 1,072 metro
