= Desojo =

Town and municipality in Spain

Coordinates: 42°35′17″N 2°16′33″W

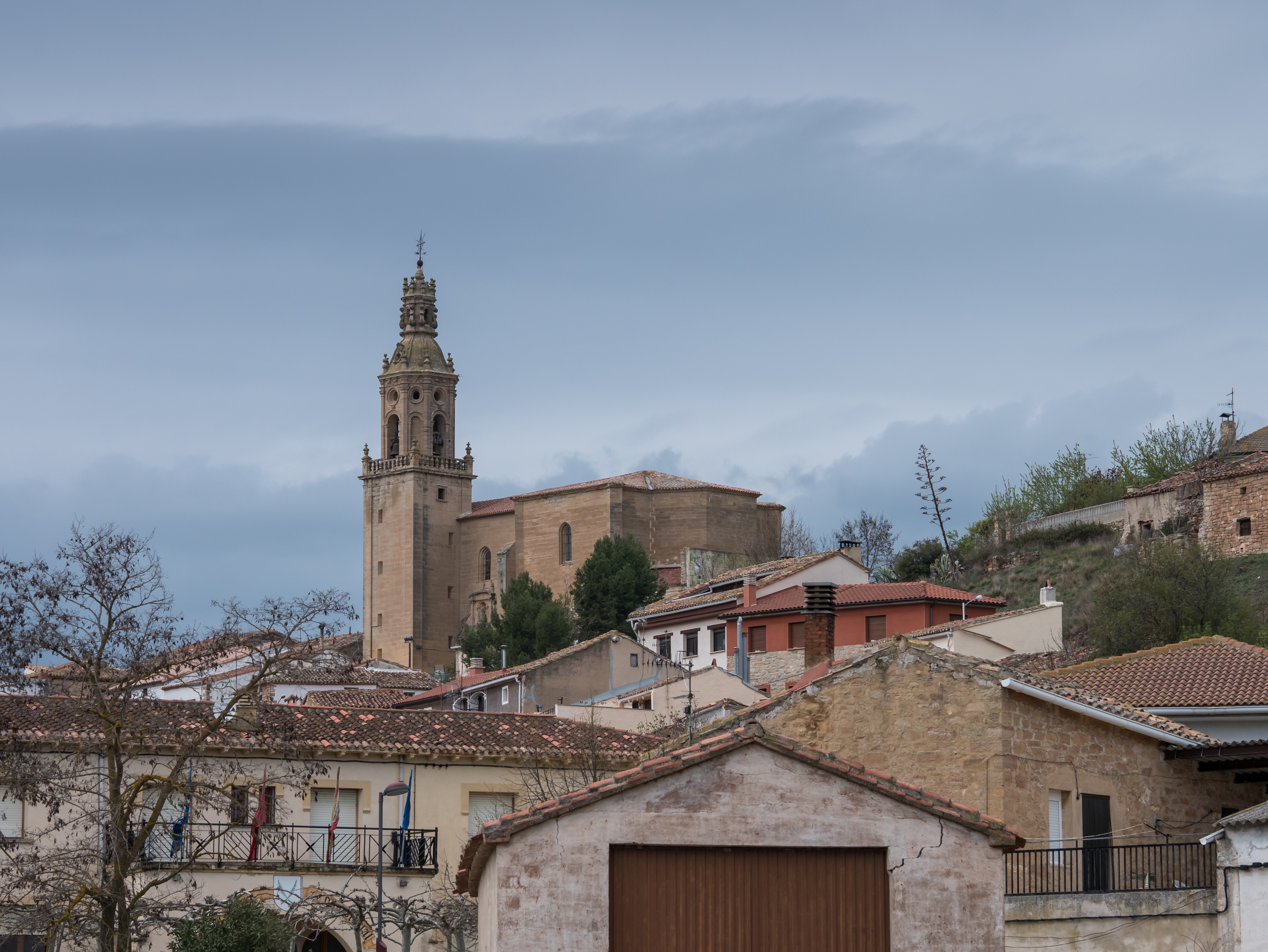
Desojo

Desojo is a town and municipality located in the province and autonomous community of Navarre, northern Spain. (Esotzo in euskera)
