= Espronceda =

Town in Navarre, Spain

Coordinates: 42°36′53″N 2°18′9″W

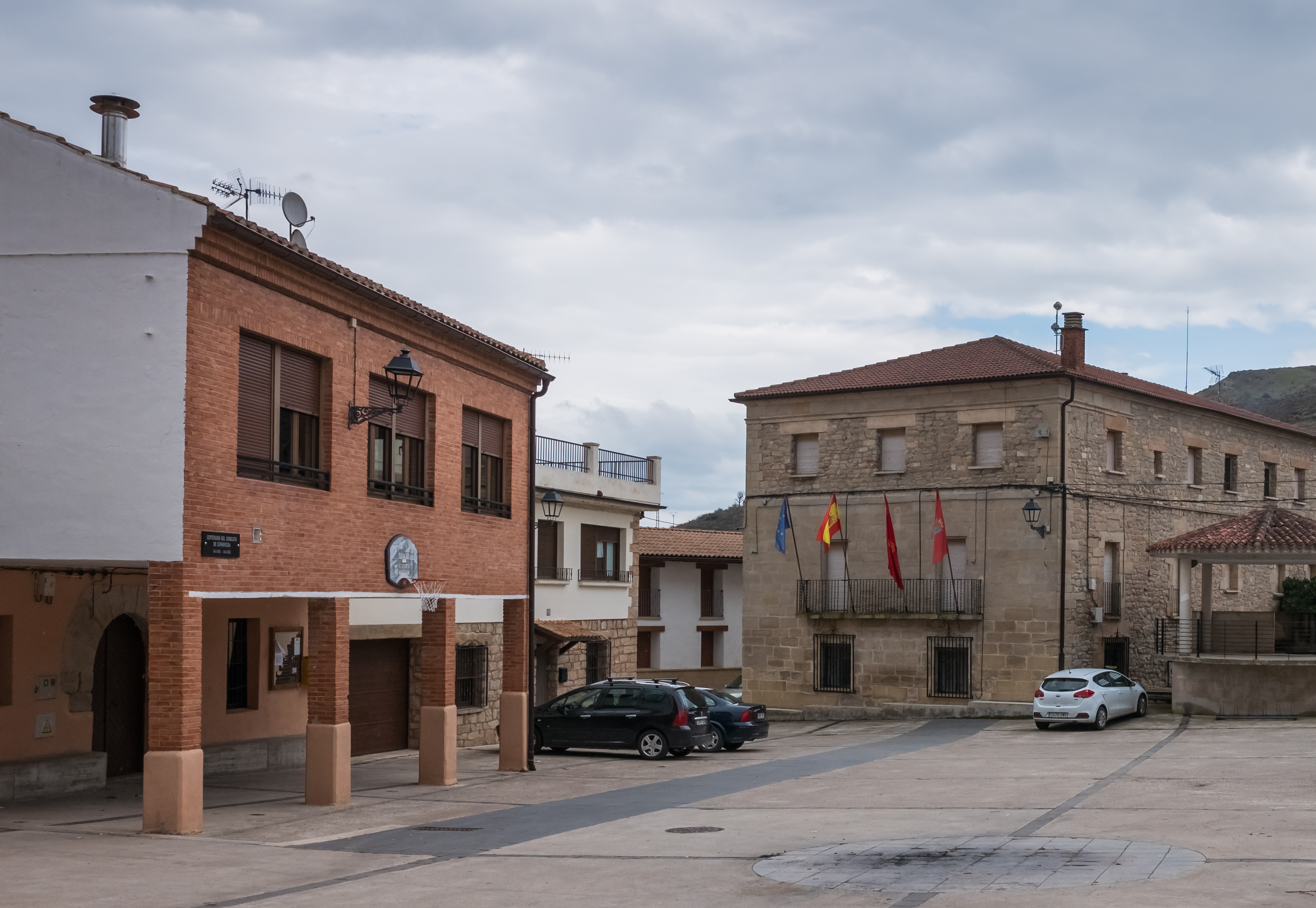
Los Fueros Square in Espronceda, Town Hall. Navarre, Spain

Espronceda is a town and municipality located in the province and autonomous community of Navarre, northern Spain.
