= Torralba Del Río =

Torralba del Río
- Municipality
- Coat of arms

- Location in Navarre
- Coordinates: 42°36′31″N 2°19′47″W
- Country: Spain
- Autonomous Community: Navarre
- Merindad: Estella

Government
  - Mayor: Ricardo Ruiz de Gaona Carlos

Area
  - Total: 17.69 km^{2} (6.83 sq mi)
- Elevation: 629 m (2,064 ft)

Population (2025-01-01)
  - Total: 96
  - Density: 5.4/km^{2} (14/sq mi)
- Demonym(s): Torralbés, Torralbesa
- Time zone: UTC+1 (CET)
  - Summer (DST): UTC+2 (CEST)
- Postal code: 31228
- Official language(s): Basque, Spanish
- Website: www.torralbadelrio.org

Torralba del Río is a town and municipality in the province and autonomous community of Navarre, northern Spain.

The Santuario de Nuestra Señora de Codés is located within the Torralba del Río municipal term in the Codés Range.
