= Marañón, Navarre =

Town in Spain

Coordinates: 42°37′46″N 2°29′15″W

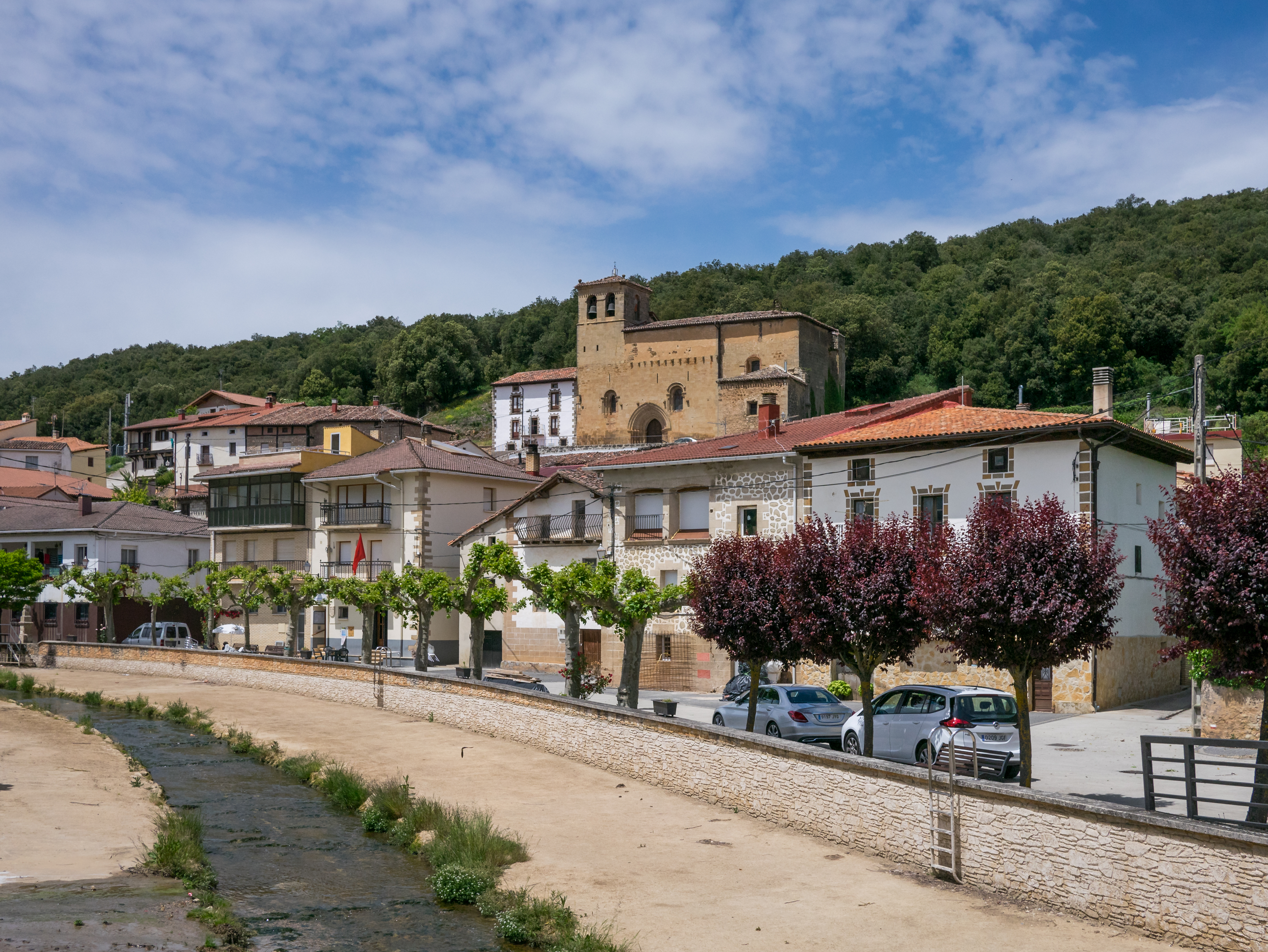
Marañón

Marañón is a town and municipality located in the province and autonomous community of Navarre, northern Spain.
