= Estella Oriental =

Coordinates: 42°40′18″N 2°5′51″W

Estella Oriental Lizarreria
- Eskualdea / Comarca
- Country: Spain
- Autonomous community: Navarre
- Capital: Estella-Lizarra
- Municipalities: List: See text

Population (2019)
  - Total: 30,484
- Time zone: UTC+1 (CET)
  - Summer (DST): UTC+2 (CEST)

Estella Oriental (Basque: Lizarraldea) is a comarca in Navarre, Spain.

== Municipalities ==
The comarca consists of thirty-nine municipalities, with the largest being the municipality of Estella-Lizarra. They are listed below with their populations at recent censuses, together with the most recent official estimate:

Name	Population Census 2001	Population Census 2011	Population Estimate 2019
Estella-Lizarra	13,024	13,056	13,810
Salinas de Oro (Jaitz)	105	117	109
Goñi	195	192	158
Los Arcos	1,286	1,213	1,134
Villatuerta	847	1,125	1,191
Cirauqui	456	506	487
Abárzuza	530	548	538
Allín	766	854	872
Aberin	328	390	359
Ayegui	1,072	1,987	2,366
Metauten	295	288	288
Morentin	123	133	129
Lana	202	195	169
Valle de Yerri (Deierri)	1,543	1,516	1,506
Igúzquiza	347	332	325
Oteiza	916	957	918
Dicastillo	676	689	604
Guesálaz	460	456	432
Villamayor de Monjardín	134	136	119
Allo	1,021	1,046	968
Arróniz	1,130	1,106	1,051
Mendaza	348	344	287
Arellano	190	196	157
Olejua	55	56	50
Lezáun	280	268	242
Luquin	128	126	132
Etayo	89	81	58
Nazar	56	52	34
Zúñiga	173	97	109
Oco	81	70	77
Abáigar	99	101	83
Sorlada	50	66	57
Piedramillera	60	47	37
Legaria	129	110	111
Murieta	273	337	335
Aranarache	93	88	72
Larraona	143	111	102
Eulate	364	334	284
Améscoa Baja	816	793	724
Totals	28,883	30,119	30,484

== See also ==
- Category:People from Estella Oriental
