= Arnaldo de Barbazán =

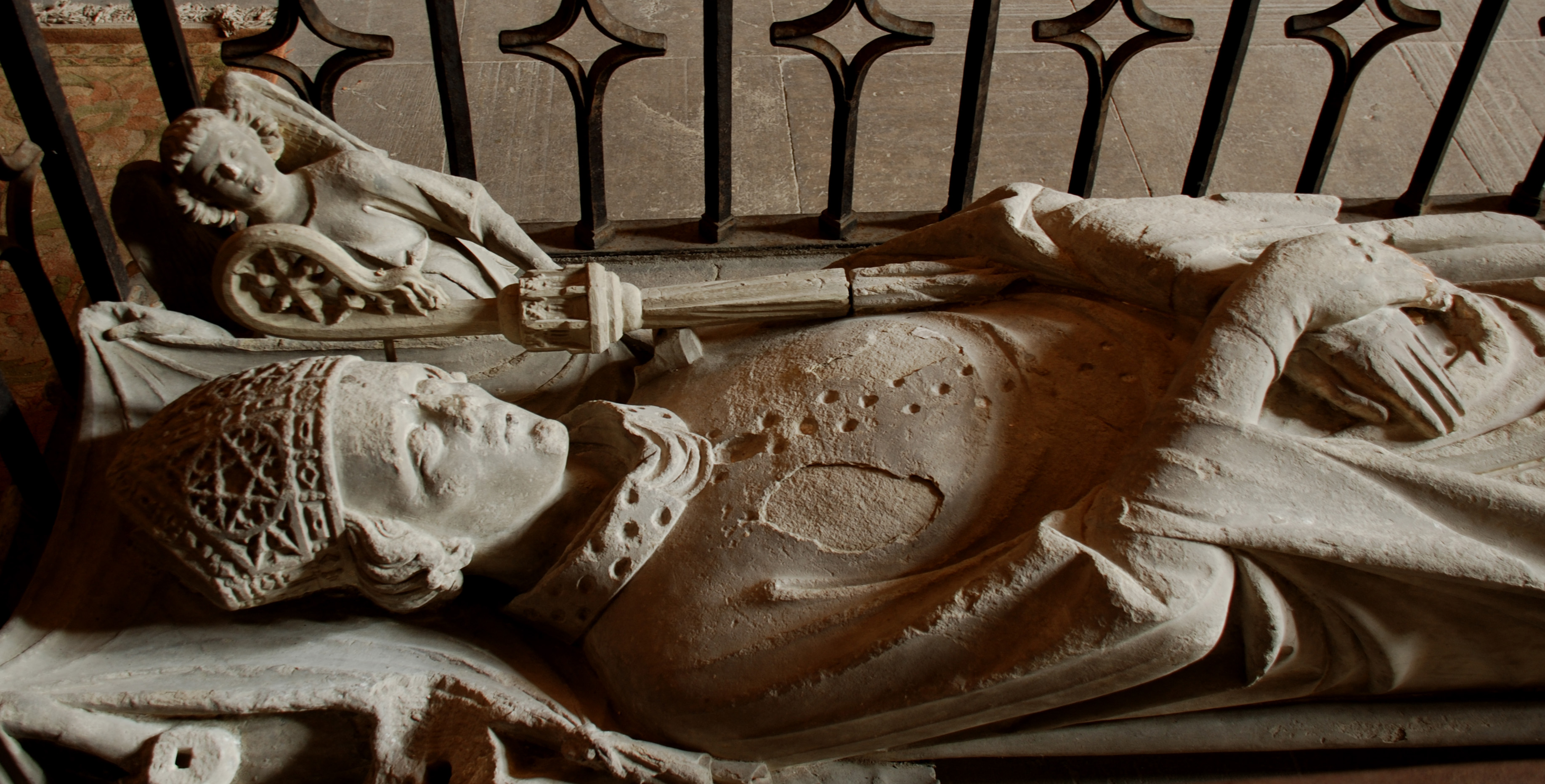
Tomb of Arnaldo de Barbazán in the crypt that he built in the cathedral of Pamplona.

Arnaldo de Barbazán (Note: His name is usually hispanicized Arnaldo, sometimes Arnalt. In French, it is spelled Arnaud, Arnaut or Arnault de Barbazan.) (died 6 November 1355) was the bishop of Pamplona from 1318 until his death.

Arnaldo was born in Barbazan-Dessus in the county of Bigorre into a noble family of merely local prominence. He was a canon regular in the cathedral of Pamiers when Pope John XXII appointed him to the vacant see of Pamplona in January 1318.

In 1319, Arnaldo was part of the delegation sent to Paris to take the oath of the French king Philip V, who had also succeeded to the Navarrese throne as Philip II. While still in Paris in September, he negotiated an accord with Philip settling the disputed temporal rights of the diocese of Pamplona. This agreement was confirmed by the pope and came into effect in 1321. Arnaldo renounced his jurisdiction in the city of Pamplona itself, his lordship over the castles of Oro and Monjardín and the villages of Adarreta, Ázqueta, Luquin, Urbiola and Villanueva. In exchange he received 500 livres and the patronato of the churches of Saint-Étienne-de-Baïgorry, Cadreita, Cáseda, Cirauqui, Echarri-Aranaz, Elcarte, Lerín, Miranda de Arga, Peralta, Sesma, Villamayor and Villatuerta.

On 5 March 1329, Arnaldo anointed Philip III and Joan II as king and queen of Navarre in the cathedral. He subsequently fell out with Philip III in 1333 over the latter's Amejoramiento del Fuero, a major revision of the Fueros of Navarre, which required the bishop of Pamplona to provide 100 knights for service in the royal army. Philip invoked this provision during the crusade of Algeciras in 1343. Following Philip's death on the crusade, the procurator-general Jacques Licras seized Arnaldo's lands and put him on trial. Only the intervention of Pope Clement VII restored good relations between Arnaldo and his sovereign, now Joan II. Only after Joan's death in 1349, did King Charles II restore Arnaldo's lands.

As bishop, Arnaldo was aided by men of high calibre: the jurist Pierre Roger de Pujols, the diocesan vicar (later bishop) Bernard Folcaut and the dean of Tudela, Jean Cruzat. He held six diocesan synods in 1325, 1330, 1346, 1349, 1354 and possibly 1341. After July 1318, Pamplona was subject to the archdiocese of Zaragoza and Arnaldo faithfully attended in person or by delegation all the provincial synods held in Zaragoza. He shut down the theological school at the College of Navarre in Paris because the students preferred to study in Toulouse.

Arnaldo added the chapel that bears his name, the Capilla de Barbazana, to the cathedral of Pamplona. Part of the cloister where the canons live, it has an impressive star-shaped vault and is a masterpiece of French Gothic in Navarre. Work on the cloister was finished during Arnaldo's episcopate. He also built the crypt beneath his chapel where he and several later bishops were buried.
