= Juan Álvarez de Eulate y Ladrón de Cegama =

Governor of New Mexico (1618–1625)

Juan de Eulate

4th Spanish Governor of New Mexico
- In office 1618–1625
- Preceded by: Bernardino de Ceballos
- Succeeded by: Felipe de Sotelo Osorio

Governor of Margarita
- In office 1630–1638
- Preceded by: Garcia Álvarez de Figueroa
- Succeeded by: Juan Luis de Camarena

Personal details
- Born: 1583; Eulate, Spain
- Died: April 9, 1655; Canary Islands, Spain

Juan de Eulate (or Juan de Ulate) (Palacio del Cabo de Armería de los Álvarez de Eulate, Améscoa Baja, Navarre, 1583 - Palacio del Cabo de Armería de los Álverez de Eulate, Améscoa Baja, Navarre, 9 April 1655) was a Spanish soldier who served with distinction in the Netherlands, and later was appointed Governor of New Mexico between 1618 and 1625 at a time when it was a province of New Spain. He then became Governor of the Margarita Province, based on Isla Margarita off the coast of what today is Venezuela, from 1630 to 1638 before retiring to Spain.

== Early years ==
Juan de Eulate was born in 1583, the second son of Juan Álvarez de Eulate and doña Juana Ladrón de Cegama y Alciturry. His father owned the Palacio del Cabo de Armería de los Álverez de Eulate, in the small community of Eulate in the Kingdom of Navarre. In 1602 Eulate travelled to Flanders at his own expense and enlisted in the army of Albert VII, Archduke of Austria. He fought with valor in the brutal and protracted Siege of Ostend, and was twice wounded. He served under Ambrogio Spinola, 1st Marquis of the Balbases in two expeditions into Friesland, again distinguishing himself for his bravery. In 1608 he was given a certificate testifying to his excellent character and service, and was allowed to return to Spain.

Eulate was a captain in the Spanish fleet from 1608 to 1617. He married doña María de Albizu y Díaz de Jáuregui, and they had three children: Juan Álvarez de Eulate y Albizu was baptized 23 July 1612, María was baptized on 27 April 1617 and Yerónimo was baptized 14 May 1630. In 1617 he was made an artillery captain and sailed to New Spain. In Mexico City, on 31 December 1617 he was appointed governor and captain general of New Mexico by the Viceroy Diego Fernández de Córdoba, Marquis of Guadalcázar. He was given a large salary and had permission to use as many Indians as he wanted under the encomienda system.

== Governor of New Mexico ==
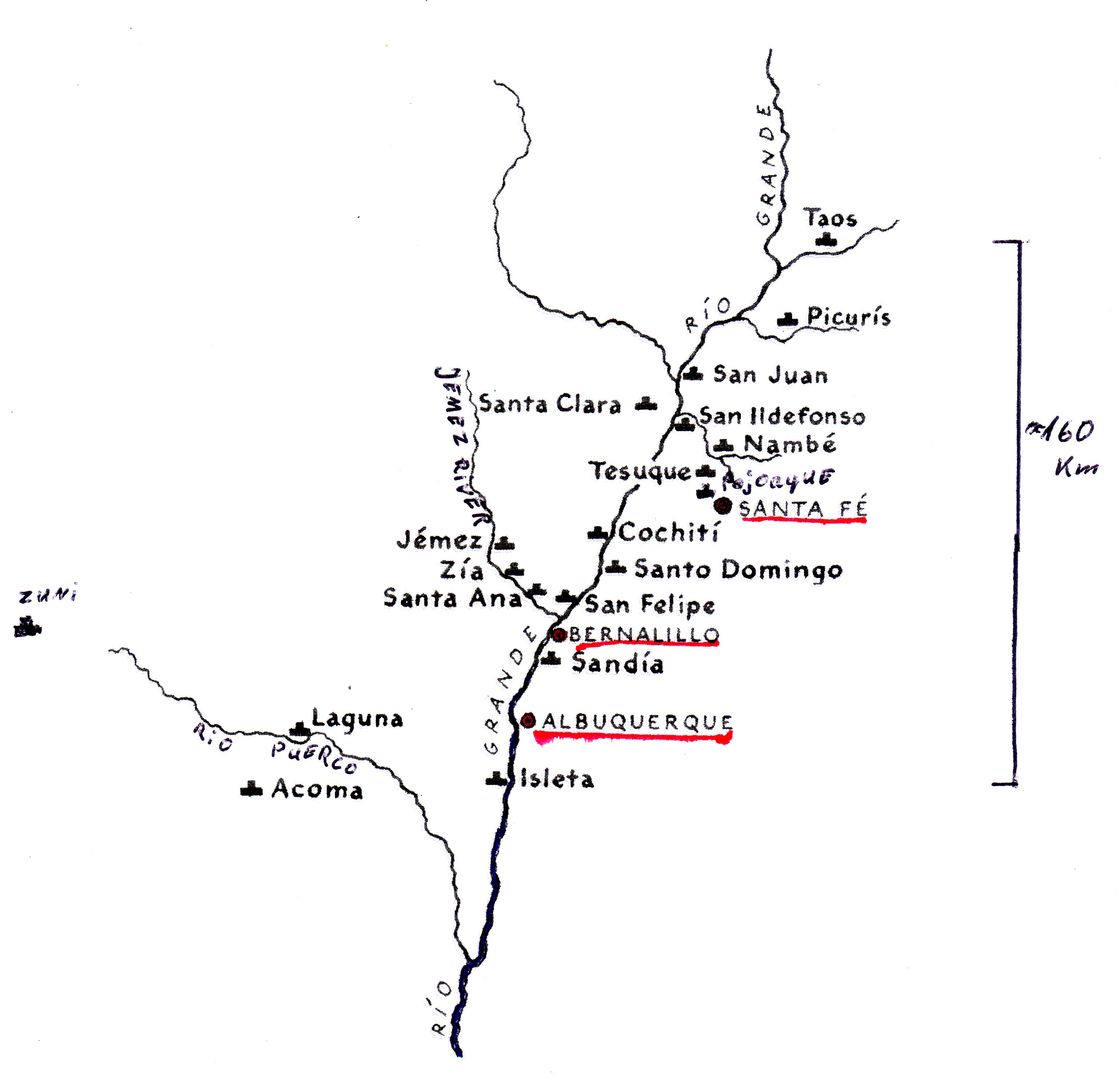
Pueblos in the Rio Grande valley of New Mexico

Eulate travelled to New Mexico accompanied by a party of soldiers and priests, arriving in December 1618. On the journey he upset the youthful Fray Pedro de Ortega, a Franciscan missionary, by declaring that marriage was a better state than celibacy, and that working married men were more useful than priests who only ate and slept. Eulate did not find any government buildings in Santa Fe, so he erected them at his own expense. (Note: It is commonly said that Eulate's predecessor Pedro de Peralta built the Santa Fe Palace of the Governors in 1610. However, it seems unlikely that this massive building could have been built so fast with the limited resources available. Possibly Peralta began the work and Eulate completed it.)

He pacified the Humanas destroying their great pueblo, the ruins of which are called Gran Quivira. He pacified the Jemez, Picuris, and the people of Zuni province, which was in the middle of a civil war. He pacified the Acoma, destroying the powerful fortress they had used as a base for twenty-six years. By the end of his term in office the province of New Mexico was quieter than it had ever been before.

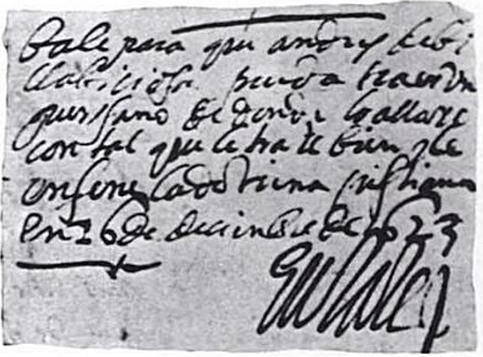
Permit issued on 16 December 1623 by Juan de Eulate, governor of New Mexico, to take an orphaned Pueblo child as a servant.

According to the missionaries, Eulate had no concern for the rights of the Indians, and was only concerned with exploiting them. He would give out licenses to his friends that authorized them to seize orphaned Indian children, who would be used as servants. A typical license read "Permit for Juan Fulano to take one orphan from wherever he finds him, provided that he treats him well and teaches him the Christian catechism." However, after he left office some of the Indian leaders testified that he had defended them against their common enemy, and also supported them against the unreasonable demands by the priests for labor. Eulate complained, perhaps with reason, that the grandiose building projects of the missionaries were a great waste of the labor of the Indians and colonists, who could have been better employed cultivating their fields.

Eulate was involved in constant disputes with the Franciscan missionaries in New Mexico, led by Esteban de Perea. In 1620 the Viceroy of New Spain heard complaints from the Indians of abuses of power, and sent orders on how the Indians were to be governed to both Perea and Eulate. Tensions between church and state rose to such a level that in 1622 the Franciscans considered abandoning New Mexico altogether, and only decided to remain due to Perea's frantic pleas. According to the Franciscan missionaries, Juan de Eulate told the Pueblo Indians of the province that they did not have to renounce their traditional religious practices. Fray Pedro Zambrano Ortiz said that Eulate protected "idolators and witches because they trade him tanned skins."

When Zambrano was assigned to the mission at Galisteo Pueblo around 1621, he was told by a native catechist whom he reproached for keeping a concubine that the Tanos were expecting to soon receive permission to "live as before they were Christians." Zambrano blamed Eulate for the conditions at Galisteo, saying he was "more suited to a junk shop than to the office of governor he holds ... a bag of arrogance and vanity without love for God or zeal for divine honor or for the king our lord, a man of evil example in word and deed who does not deserve to be governor but rather a hawker and [a creature] of these vile pursuits." On 11 April 1626 Zambrano said that Governor Eulate had ordered a deputy of the Confraternity of the Mother of God de la Concepcíon to be falsely accused and hanged because of his membership, and because he was a pious man. He said that due to Eulate's bad influence the settlers would rather gamble in his house than attend the confraternities.

In December 1625 Eulate was relieved by Admiral Felipe de Sotelo Osorio. He returned to Mexico City in the fall of 1626 with the supply caravan. Shortly after he was arrested on charges of having used some of the wagons to carry his merchandise, and having brought Indian slaves for sale in New Spain. He was released after paying a fine and paying the cost of shipping the slaves back. While governor, Eulate undertook two expeditions to capture buffalo, whose meat, hides and tallow were superior to the Spanish cattle. The first attempt only obtained calves, who died despite attempts to feed them with goat milk. The second captured adults who survived. Eulate took three females and a male with him to New Spain, but was forced to leave them near Mexico City because there was no room on the boats to take them back to Spain.

== Later career ==
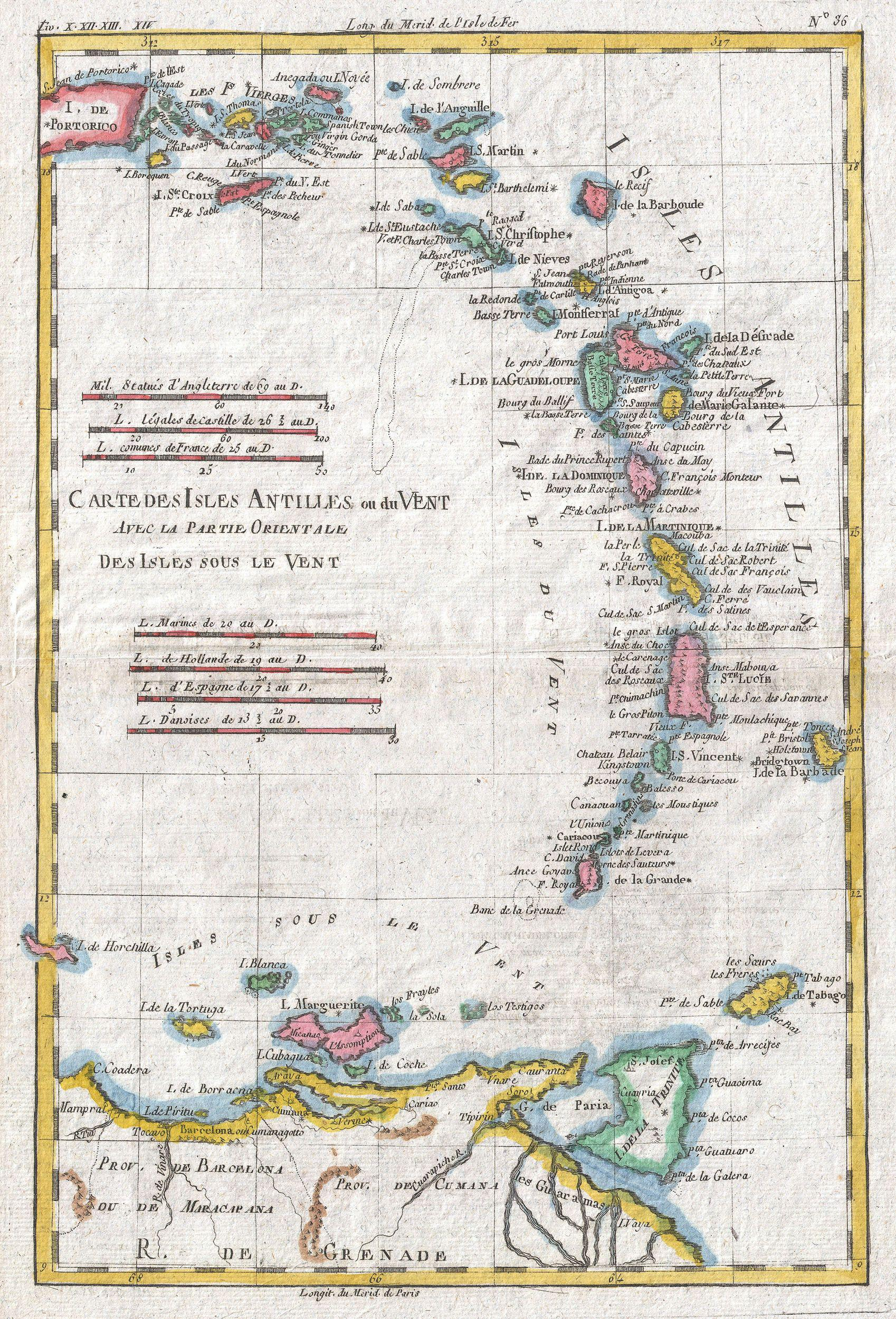
Later map showing Tortuga, Margarita, Trinidad and Tobago off the shore of South America, and the Antilles to the north.

Eulate was appointed governor of the Margarita Province in 1630, based on Isla Margarita off the coast of what is now Venezuela. He held office for eight years. He improved the defense of the island and helped develop commerce and the pearl fisheries. His forces were active in Tortuga and Tobago, where they fought against the Dutch piracy. On 12 May 1633 Eulate's son Julian de Eulate left Margarita for nearby Trinidad in three large piraguas carrying three militia companies and 50 natives auxiliaries. He found and captured eleven English settlers and twenty Indians, part of a larger expedition led by Sir Henry Colt that had been diverted to Saint Kitts.

In December 1636 Eulate provided forty Spanish militiamen to Captain Martin de Mendoza, who also raised four hundred soldiers from Santo Tomé in Venezuela and San José de Oruña on Trinidad, as well as three thousand natives. With this force, Mendoza captured a fortress on Galera Point in Trinidad, and two others on Tobago. Fort Vlissingen on Tobago fell on 1 January 1637. Forty two cannon and 160 prisoners of different nationalities were taken. Most of the prisoners were hanged on Margarita. Their leaders were taken to Spain.

A number of Africans were among the prisoners. The Spanish spared nineteen boys due to their age, and strangled the others. In 1638 Eulate's term as governor ended and he returned to Spain. He was called to the court of the Kingdom of Navarre in 1640, made a member of the Order of Santiago, given the title of Maestre de Campo and appointed castellan of Pamplona. The historian France V. Scholes described Eulate as "a petulant, tactless, irreverent soldier whose actions were inspired by open contempt for the Church and its ministers and by an exeggerated conception of his own authority as the representative of the Crown." He was often quoted as saying "The king is my patron."
