= Emiliana de Zubeldia =

Spanish pianist and composer

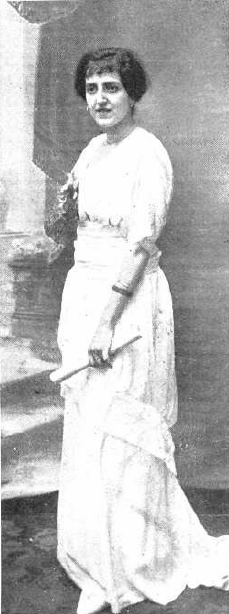
Emiliana de Zubeldía

Emiliana de Zubeldía Inda (6 December 1888 – 26 May 1987) was a Spanish pianist and composer. She is known for her piano, choral, and solo voice compositions.

== Biography ==
Emiliana de Zubeldia was born on 6 December 1888 in Salinas de Oro, Navarre, in northern Spain, and emigrated to Latin America prior to the outbreak of the Spanish Civil War. She began her musical studies at Pamplona and in 1904 continued at the Schola Cantorum in Paris, where she studied composition with Vincent d'Indy and piano with Blanche Selva.

She returned to Pamplona at the death of his father in 1909. She returned to Paris in 1922 to continue her studies in composition. In 1928 she toured the America's including Rio de Janeiro, São Paulo, Montevideo, Buenos Aires and, in 1930, moved to New York City. Zubeldia met Andrés Segovia and Nicanor Zabaleta in New York in 1933. Both began their careers as soloists and shared Zubeldia's broadcasts on Radio City Music Hall, giving talks about Spanish music until the summer of 1934.

Zubeldia toured the Caribbean and Mexico, and in 1935 she settled in Mexico. After the Spanish Civil War, she took Mexican citizenship in 1942 and, in 1947, moved to Hermosillo, Sonora. She founded the Academy of Music at the University of Sonora where she worked for forty years as a music teacher, choral director, lecturer and radio program producer and songwriter. She died in the State of Sonora General Hospital on 26 May 1987 at the age of 98.

== Works ==
Emiliana de Zubeldia composed for piano, voice, guitar, chamber ensembles, chorus, mass and orchestra.

Selected works include:

- Seis canciones populares españolas for solo voice and piano, published 1926.
- Capricho Basko, guitar, dedicated to Luis de la Maza, dated Montevideo, April 1929.
- Landscape Basko, guitar, allegro, dedicated to Andrés Segovia. Probably composed in New York in 1934.
- Landscape from the Pyrenees, for harp, in tribute to Nicanor Zabaleta.
