= Bernardino de Ceballos =

2nd Spanish Governor of New Mexico
- In office 1608–1610
- Preceded by: Juan de Oñate
- Succeeded by: Pedro de Peralta

4th Spanish Governor of New Mexico
- In office 1613/1614–1618
- Preceded by: Pedro de Peralta
- Succeeded by: Juan de Eulate

Personal details
- Born: 16th century
- Died: 17th century

Bernardino de Ceballos (or Zavallos, Cevallos, Caballos etc.) was Governor of New Mexico between 1614 and 1618 at a time when it was a province of New Spain.

== Background ==
The governor preceding Ceballos, Pedro de Peralta, had been arrested on 12 August 1613 by Fray Isidro Ordóñez, the fiery Franciscan friar who headed the church in New Mexico. Peralta was chained and imprisoned in the mission of Nuestra Senora de los Dolores (Our Lady of Sorrows) at Sandia. His jailer was Fray Esteban de Perea, who disapproved but obeyed. Ordóñez assumed full civil as well as religious power in New Mexico until Ceballos arrived. Peralta was not allowed to leave until November 1614, after Ordóñez and the new governor had taken most of his possessions.

== Governor of New Mexico ==
Don Bernardino de Ceballos was Admiral at Acapulco, and kept this title when he was appointed Governor of New Mexico on 5 August 1613 by the Viceroy of New Spain, Diego Fernández de Córdoba, Marquis of Guadalcázar. He traveled to New Mexico with the supply train in the spring of 1614. The caravan included one covered wagon with eleven mules and was escorted by fifteen soldiers. Ceballos arrived in Santa Fe in May 1614. At first he tried to maintain friendly relations with the church, but within a year there were serious disputes with Ordóñez over the use and treatment of the Pueblo Indians. At one point Ceballos was excommunicated and forced to do public penance. Ordóñez finally left with the returning supply train in the spring of 1617. Ceballos's term ended on 21 December 1618 when his successor Juan de Eulate arrived. The disputes between the friars and the secular administration later became so violent that in 1620 the King himself had to intervene, taking the side of his governors.
