= Dicastillo =

Municipality in Navarre, Spain

- Municipality
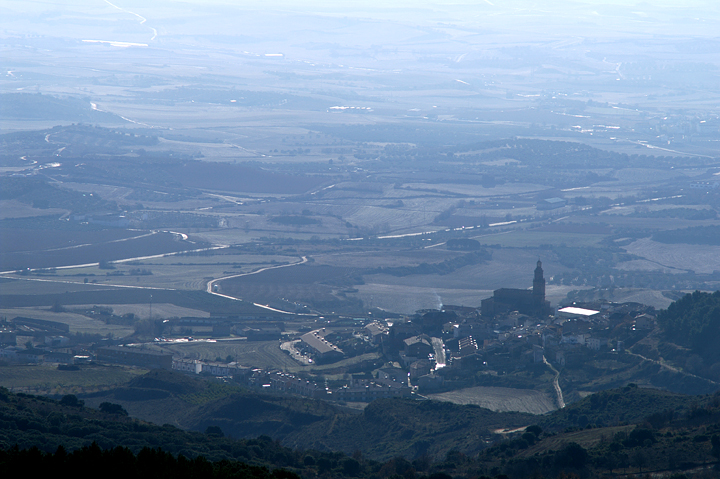
- View of Dicastillo.

- Coat of arms

- Location of Dicastillo. Dicastillo (Navarre)
- Coordinates: 42°36′N 2°01′W
- Country: Spain
- Community: Navarre
- Province: Navarre
- Comarca: Estella Oriental

Government
  - Mayor: Miguel Ángel Remírez (Ind.)

Area
  - Total: 33.41 km^{2} (12.90 sq mi)

Population (2023)
  - Total: 574
  - Density: 17.2/km^{2} (44.5/sq mi)
- Time zone: UTC+1 (CET)
  - Summer (DST): UTC+2 (CEST)
- Postal code: 31263
- Website: www.dicastillo.es

Dicastillo (Basque: Deikaztelun) is a town and municipality located in the province and autonomous community of Navarre, northern Spain. The towns that are near to Dicastillo are Estella and Arellano.

== Demographics ==
According to the 2023 Register, there are 574 people in Dicastillo. They mostly work on the farms, the stone factory, in shops and the winery.

== Festivals ==
The Dicastillo festivals are in August, where a main focus is the music. There festivals include the Festival of San Blas, on 3 of February, the Asparagu's day in spring, and blood donor's day in winter.

== Facilities ==
The notable buildings in Dicastillo are the hermitage and the church from the 16th century. There is also a palace from the 19th century. The palace has been converted into a restaurant and a winery. A famous music band from Dicastillo is called Banda Bizkarra. Bizkarra has existed for 53 years and was formed by 30 musicians.

Dicastillo has varied scenery, a notable mountain, Montejurra, and the Ega River where people can fish. There is much farmland devoted to the growing of wheat and maize.
