= Felipe de Sotelo Osorio =

6th Spanish governor of New Mexico
- In office 21 December 1625 (assumed the charge in 6 February 1626) – 1630
- Preceded by: Juan de Eulate
- Succeeded by: Francisco Manuel de Silva Nieto

Personal details
- Born: unknown unknown
- Died: unknown unknown
- Profession: Admiral and Governor of New Mexico

Felipe de Sotelo Osorio was a Spanish military leader who served as Governor of New Mexico between 1625 and 1630.

== Biography ==
Felipe de Sotelo Osorio was not a practicing Catholic, so he did not usually go to Mass. He joined the Spanish Navy in his youth, eventually becoming an Admiral.

He was appointed Governor of Nuevo México on May 22, 1625 but did not leave for Santa Fe until late December, having spent the summer assembling the people and supplies needed for the journey. At that time, Osorio was living in Zacatecas, Mexico. It is said that he traveled from El Paso del Norte to Santa Fe on foot, a distance of 400 miles, but others in the company traveled by horse, mule and wagons. Accompanied by the Franciscan Alonso de Benavides, the first Commissary of the Holy Office of the Inquisition in Nuevo Mexico, they first they reached La Villa de Santa Fe on 6 February 1626.

After becoming governor, Sotelo rejected the Roman Catholic Church that he viewed as a dictatorship, thus provoking clashes with the institution.

It is said that Sotelo once joined a Catholic mass when this one had already started, and reproached some of his soldiers for not standing when they saw him entering the enclosure. Although the soldiers reminded him that they should always remain seated before the Sanctus, Sotelo angrily insisted that they always had to stand up in his presence. Sotelo also said that if he was excommunicated by the church, he would force a priest to suspend that excommunication in just two hours. These statements (considered blasphemies by the Clergy) resulted in legal charges, which were led by the Inquisition.

At some point during his time as Governor of Nuevo México a group of Vaquero Apaches visited Santa Fe because they wanted to see a statue of the "Mother of God" called the La Conqistadora. The Apaches remarked about how much they liked the statue and promised to become Christians. As the Apaches left the town, Sotelo Osorio ordered a "Gutsy" rival Indian captain to "bring back whomever they could find." The captain did just, killing several of the Apaches as well as bringing prisoners back to Santa Fe. Notably the captain of the Apaches, who was killed in the raid, still had a rosary around his neck.

Felipe de Sotelo Osorio was succeeded by Francisco Manuel de Silva Nieto in 1630.
