= Pedro de Peralta =

Spanish colonial governor of New Mexico

3rd Spanish Governor of New Mexico
- In office 1610–1614
- Preceded by: Bernardino de Ceballos
- Succeeded by: Bernardino de Ceballos

Personal details
- Born: c. 1584 Valladolid, Crown of Castile
- Died: 1666 Madrid, Crown of Castile

Pedro de Peralta (c. 1584 – 1666) was Governor of New Mexico between 1610 and 1613 at a time when it was a province of New Spain. He formally founded the city of Santa Fe, New Mexico in 1610. In August 1613 he was arrested and jailed for almost a year by the Franciscan friar Isidro Ordóñez. Later, he was vindicated by the Mexican Inquisition and held a number of other senior posts in the Spanish imperial administration.

== Background ==
The settlement of New Mexico began when Juan de Oñate led a group of colonizers into the territory in 1598, serving as governor from 1601 until 1609. By 1608, there were only 200 Spanish people, almost all in the capital of San Gabriel on the west bank of the Rio Grande opposite San Juan Pueblo. No gold or silver had been found and the viceroy was receiving reports of mistreatment of the Indians and of near-starvation of the settlers. Due to these problems, on 13 September 1608 the Council of the Indies made a formal recommendation that New Mexico be abandoned. However, soon afterwards, Fray Lázaro Jiménez brought news from New Mexico that 7,000 Indians had been converted and baptized. They could not be abandoned, so King Philip III of Spain suspended the order to evacuate the colony.

== Governor of New Mexico ==
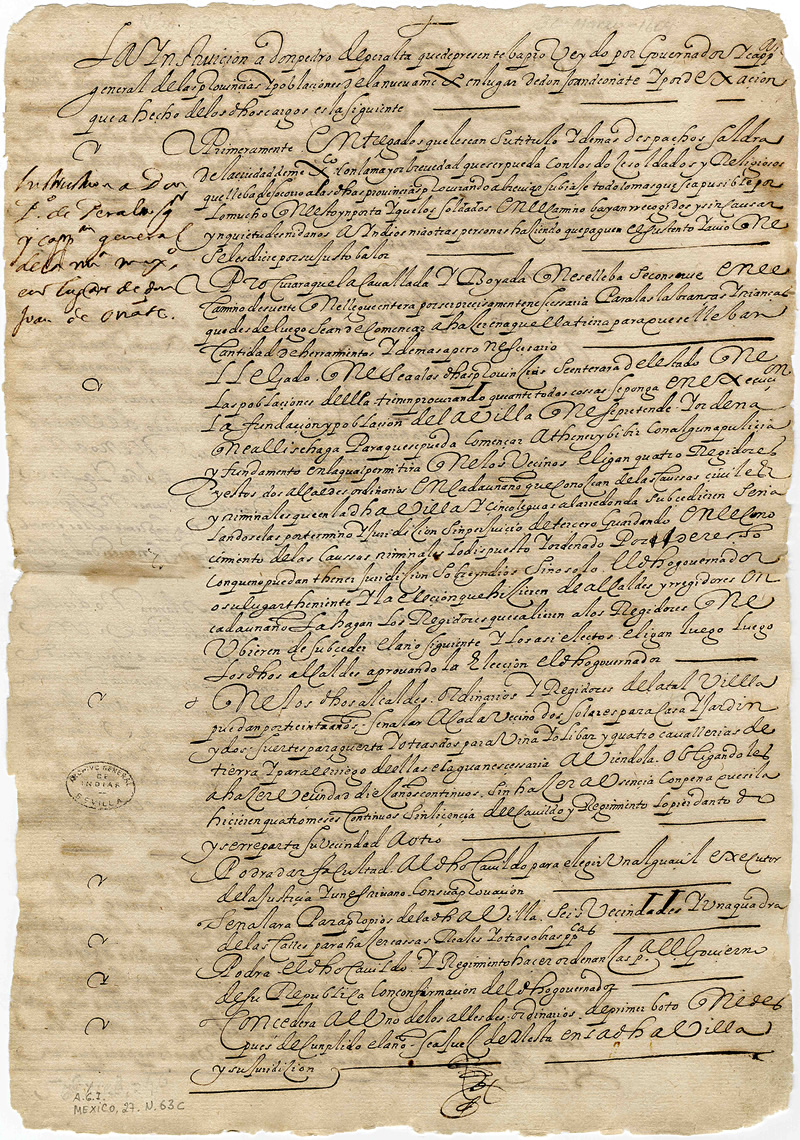
Orders to Pedro de Peralta upon appointment as Governor of New Mexico, 1609

According to one source, Don Pedro de Peralta was a bachelor of canon law. A report of possessions found in his house after his arrest includes a law book. Peralta was appointed governor of Santa Fe de Nuevo México (New Mexico) by the Viceroy, Luis de Velasco, marqués de Salinas on 31 March 1609, shortly after Peralta had arrived from Spain. Juan de Oñate had asked Velasco for compensation for his efforts in New Mexico, and asked that his son Christóbal be allowed to succeed him. Valasco replied that he had named Peralta as governor, and that Onate should hand over to him when he arrived at the Rio Grande and should then return with his son to Mexico City without delay. An expedition with supplies and reinforcements left for the north late in 1609. Peralta reached the capital, La Villa de San Gabriel, early in 1610. He was met by Oñate, who left for the south in early February to face charges of maladministration. Peralta brought twelve soldiers and eight Franciscan priests with him. His instructions included searching for the Straits of Anián, (Note: The Straits of Anián were thought to connect the Atlantic to the Pacific, stretching above North America at 55° to 60° of latitude.) on which he should establish a secure port.

San Gabriel was remote from the main Pueblo Indian population centers. Juan de Oñate had planned to move the capital south to the Santa Fe River valley. Peralta selected a defensible site with ample available land and a good water supply for the town, which he called Santa Fe. He and his surveyor laid out the town, including the districts, house and garden plots and the Santa Fe Plaza for the government buildings. These included the governor's headquarters, government offices, a jail, arsenal and a chapel. On completion, the plaza could hold "1,000 people, 5000 head of sheep, 400 head of horses, and 300 head of cattle without crowding." The palace was built for defense with three-foot-thick adobe walls. The Palace of the Governors is now the oldest continuously occupied building in the United States, and as of 1999 housed the Museum of New Mexico. (Note: It is commonly said that Peralta built the governor's palace in 1610. However, it seems unlikely that this massive building could have been built so fast with the limited resources available. Governor Juan de Eulate, who arrived in 1618, said he found no headquarters and he had to build it. Possibly Peralta began the work and it was completed later.)

The church assumed that the main objective in New Mexico was to convert the Indians, and the civil power existed only in order to provide protection and to support this goal. As chief magistrate and head of the army, the governor had equal powers but different objectives, so clashes were inevitable. The church argued that the friars had a duty to protect the Indians from abuses by the military and civilians. Perhaps to weaken the church position, Peralta issued strict regulations that imposed imprisonment for ten days by the civil authority for any Spaniard found guilty of abusing an Indian worker. A fine was also payable to the victim. This resulted in some incidents where Pueblos deliberately provoked violence in order to earn the fine.

Fray Isidro de Ordóñez, who had twice before been in New Mexico, arrived with the supply train in 1612 as the leader of nine Franciscan friars. When he reached the southernmost mission at Sandia Pueblo, he produced a document that apparently made him Father Commissary, or head of the church in New Mexico, although later the document was said to be a forgery. In Santa Fe, despite Peralta's protests, Ordóñez proclaimed that any soldier or colonist could leave if they wanted to. Ordóñez also accused Peralta of underfeeding the natives who were working on the construction of Santa Fe. The struggle for power intensified, and in May 1613 Ordonez excommunicated Peralta, posting a notice announcing this on the doors of the Santa Fe church.

On 12 August 1613 Ordóñez and his followers arrested Peralta and had him chained and imprisoned in the mission of Nuestra Señora de los Dolores (Our Lady of Sorrows) at Sandia. His jailer was Fray Esteban de Perea, who disapproved but obeyed. Ordóñez assumed full civil as well as religious power in New Mexico until a new temporal governor, don Bernardino de Ceballos, arrived in New Mexico in the summer of 1614. Peralta was not allowed to leave until November 1614, after Ordóñez and the new governor had taken most of his possessions. This was the start of long-running disputes between the friars and the secular administration, which later became so violent that in 1620 the King himself had to intervene, taking the side of his governors.

== Later career ==
Peralta returned to Mexico City and told his version of the dispute with Ordóñez. The Mexican Inquisition eventually ordered Ordóñez to return to Mexico City, and reprimanded him. Peralta was vindicated. Shortly afterwards, he was appointed alcalde mayor of the port of Acapulco. Peralta moved to Caracas, in what is now Venezuela, where he served as an official in the royal treasury in the 1640s and early 1650s. He married in Caracas in 1637. Peralta later resigned his commission in 1654 and then lived in retirement in Madrid until his death. Pedro de Peralta died in 1666.

== Later legends about the Peralta family ==
Most likely because of Pedro de Peralta's previous governorship his family name of "Peralta" was the inspiration for a number of legends in the Southwest region of the United States. It is unclear if any of the Peraltas who may have inhabited the area in the 1700s and later were any relation to Pedro de Peralta.

In the 1870s and 1880s James Reavis popularized the idea of a rich Peralta family who had lived and ruled over part of the American Southwest. He tried to assert a Peralta Spanish land grant and barony granted by the King of Spain, which included a huge swath of Arizona and New Mexico, including the Superstition Mountains. Dr. George M. Willing, a territorial delegate to Congress, claimed to have purchased the land grant from a man named Miguel Peralta (Reavis became Willing's partner to defend the claim and initially the US Government indicated Reavis' documents supported the legitimacy of the land grant). Reavis married a woman he claimed was the Peralta heiress to the "barony of Arizona" and he became known as "the Baron of Arizona." Reavis convinced some in the disputed land grant area to pay him for quitclaims on their existing properties and sold other areas to property investors. Reavis' forged Peralta genealogy and other documents were later exposed, and he served a prison sentence for fraud. His partner (Dr. Willing) died earlier in 1874.

According to legend, but not supported by historical records, the Peralta family owned land near the Superstition Mountains. The Peralta Massacre is a legend that Apaches supposedly ambushed a mining expedition the family sent into the mountains. Some carved stones in the area are referred to as "Peralta Stones" and Spanish text and crude maps on them are considered by some to be clues to the location of a Peralta family gold mine in the Superstition Mountains, although others believe the stones to be modern fakes. The last patriarch of the family was supposedly a large landowner named Don Miguel Peralta, who some claim was the one with the land grant (or perhaps sold a false land grant) that became part of the Reavis fraud. The Peralta mine in the Superstition Mountains is part of the legends about the origin of the Lost Dutchman's Gold Mine.
