= Legaria =

- Municipality
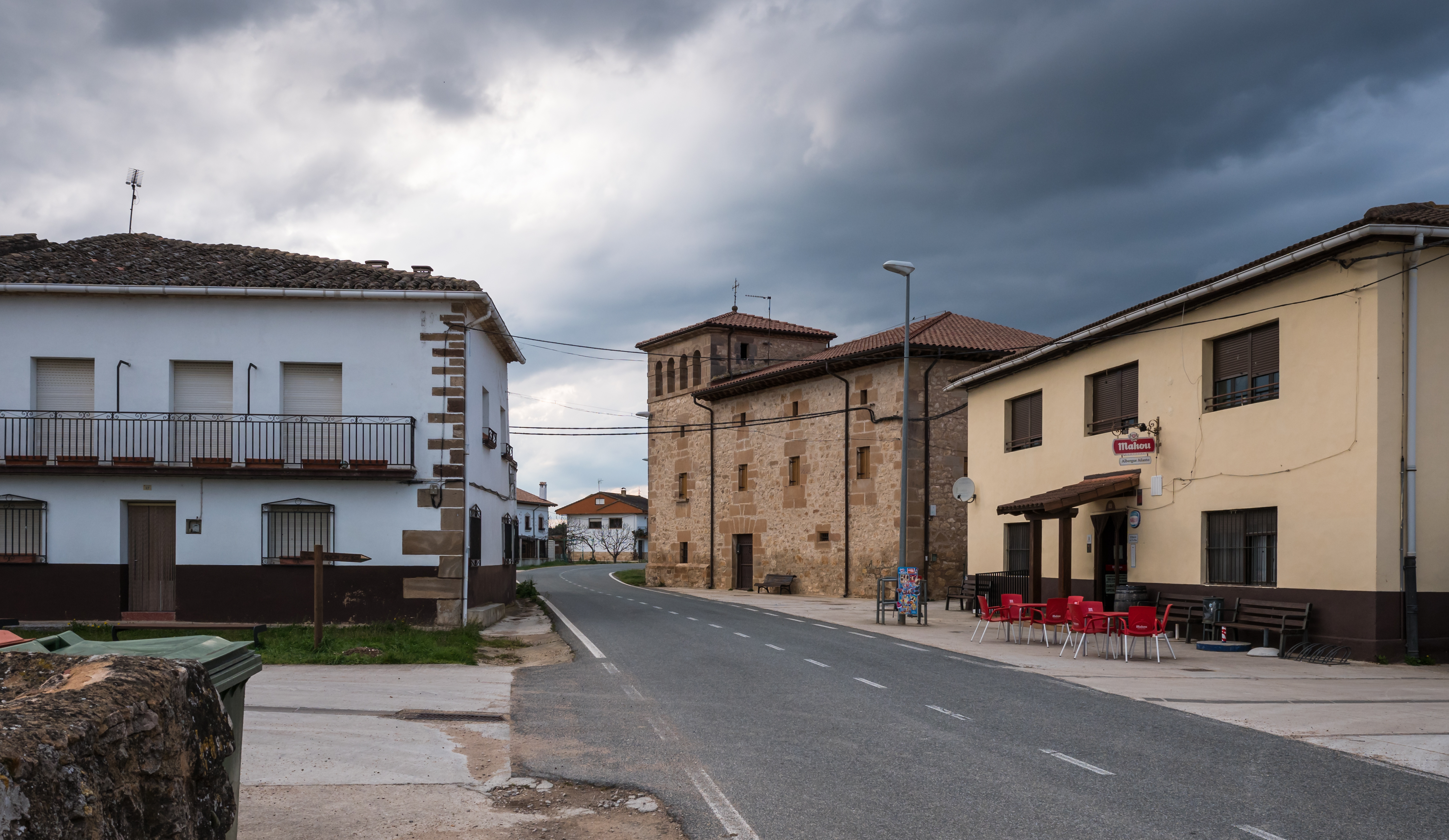

- Coat of arms

- Location in Navarre
- Coordinates: 42°38′55″N 2°10′24″W
- Country: Spain
- Community: Navarre
- Province: Navarre

Population (2025-01-01)
  - Total: 111
- Time zone: UTC+1 (CET)
  - Summer (DST): UTC+2 (CEST)

Legaria is a town and municipality located in the province and autonomous community of Navarre, northern Spain. A stream passes on the north side of the town. Nearby towns are Ancín and Murieta.
