= Isidro Ordóñez =

Spanish priest

- Occupation: Franciscan friar
- Known for: Imprisoning Governor Pedro de Peralta

Isidro Ordóñez was a Franciscan friar who seized control of New Mexico in 1613, imprisoning Governor Pedro de Peralta. Later he was summoned to Mexico City and reprimanded for his actions by the Mexican Inquisition.

== Early years ==
Ordóñez was one of just ten friars who spent time in New Mexico between 1601 and 1610 during the regime of the first governor, Juan de Oñate. In 1606 the king of Spain called a halt to further exploration in New Mexico. Discouraged by the lack of support for his colony, on 24 August 1607 Juan de Oñate sent a letter of resignation to the viceroy Luis de Velasco, marqués de Salinas. This was accepted, and Martínez de Montoya was named interim governor, but Oñate was ordered to remain until his permanent replacement arrived. The local council felt Montoya was unsuitable, and named the governor's son Cristóbal de Oñate interim governor instead, a decision that Montoya seems to have accepted.

On 7 March 1608 Viceroy Velasco recommended discontinuing the work of the colony and bringing the few Indians who had been converted back to New Spain. Oñate sent Fray Lázaro Ximénez back to Mexico City with Isidro Ordonez to explain the situation in the colony. Martínez de Montoya accompanied them, and would not return. Fray Lázaro reached Mexico City in late October 1608, where he stated that as many of 7,000 Indians had been converted. This prompted the Viceroy to appoint a new governor, Pedro de Peralta, and to dispatch a group of friars to New Mexico. Ordóñez returned to New Mexico with this group led by Fray Alonso de Peinado, then in 1611 again returned to New Spain to obtain fresh supplies and more recruits.

== Commissary of New Mexico ==
Ordóñez arrived with the supply train in 1612 as the leader of nine Franciscan friars. When he reached the southernmost mission at Sandia Pueblo in August 1612, he produced a document that apparently made him Father Commissary, or head of the church in New Mexico, although later the document was said to be a forgery. Fray Alonso de Peinado accepted Ordóñez's commission. In Santa Fe, despite Governor Pedro de Peralta's protests, Ordóñez proclaimed that any soldier or colonist could leave if they wanted to. Ordóñez also accused Peralta of underfeeding the natives who were working on the construction of Santa Fe. In 1613, Ordonez began construction of a church at Nambé Pueblo, about 15 miles (24 km) north of Santa Fe. When Peralta sent soldiers to Nambe to collect the pueblo's quota of workers to help build the governor's palace, Ordonez refused to release any workers.

Another dispute arose in May 1613 when some soldiers who were going north to collect tribute from the Indians at Taos Pueblo met Ordóñez, who sent them back to Santa Fe to observe the Feast of Pentecost. The soldiers obeyed. On their return, the governor immediately dispatched them to Taos again, saying they could observe the feast at any of the missions on the route. As an agent of the inquisition, Ordóñez threatened to excommunicate the governor if he did not withdraw his order, the governor refused and was excommunicated. There were further incidents, in which bystanders were torn between support for the two competing authorities, before a fragile truce was negotiated and the excommunication withdrawn. The truce was temporary. In July 1613, Ordóñez said in his sermon following a perceived insult,

Do not be deceived. Let no one persuade himself with vain words that I do not have the same power and authority that the pope in Rome has, or that if his holiness were here in New Mexico he could do more than I. Believe you that I can arrest, cast into irons, and punish as seems fitting to me any person without exception who is not obedient to the commandments of the church and mine. What I have told you, I say for the benefits of a certain person who is listening to me who perhaps raises his eyebrows.

When the governor refused to submit, despite this warning, Ordóñez accused him of being a heretic, a Lutheran and a Jew, thus rhetorically outcasting him from Catholicism. On 12 August 1613 Ordóñez and his followers arrested Peralta and had him chained and imprisoned in the mission of Neustra Senora de los Dolores (Our Lady of Sorrows) at Sandia. His jailer was Fray Esteban de Perea, who disapproved but obeyed. Ordóñez assumed full civil as well as religious power in New Mexico until a new temporal governor, don Bernardino de Ceballos, arrived in New Mexico in the spring of 1614. Peralta was not allowed to leave until November 1614, after Ordóñez and the new governor had taken most of his possessions. At first Ceballos tried to maintain friendly relations with the church, but within a year there were serious disputes with Ordóñez over the use and treatment of the Pueblo Indians. At one point Ceballos was excommunicated and forced to do public penance.

== Later events ==
After hearing Peralta's version of the disputes, the Mexican Inquisition eventually ordered Ordóñez to return. Ordóñez finally left New Mexico with the returning supply train in the spring of 1617. When he arrived in Mexico City, the Inquisition reprimanded him. Peralta was vindicated.
