= Francisco Manuel de Silva Nieto =

7th Spanish Governor of New Mexico
- In office 1 May 1629 – March 1632
- Preceded by: Felipe de Sotelo Osorio
- Succeeded by: Francisco de la Mora Ceballos

Personal details
- Died: 1632

Francisco Manuel de Silva Nieto (died 1632) was Governor of New Mexico at a time when it was a province of New Spain.

== Biography ==
Captain Don Francisco Manuel de Silva Nieto left Mexico City on 4 September 1628, reaching Santa Fe on 1 May 1629, when he took office as Governor of New Mexico. He may have travelled with the Franciscan father Estevan de Perea, who brought about thirty friars and several lay brothers to undertake missionary work in New Mexico around that time. Silva was more friendly to the friars than his predecessors had been, and helped them in their work. He gave orders that his soldiers should not molest the Pueblo Indians, on penalty of death.

On 23 June 1629 Silva left on an expedition to Zuni with thirty soldiers, ten wagons, four hundred cavalry horses and a group of priests. Perhaps due to the size of his force, he was well received by the local people of Zuni. A house was bought for the friars, serving as the first church in the province. Silva helped the Franciscans to set up other missions near Zuni. On his journey back to Santa Fe, Silva's party stopped at Inscription Rock, a large sandstone butte that is now El Morro National Monument, where someone carved the poem:

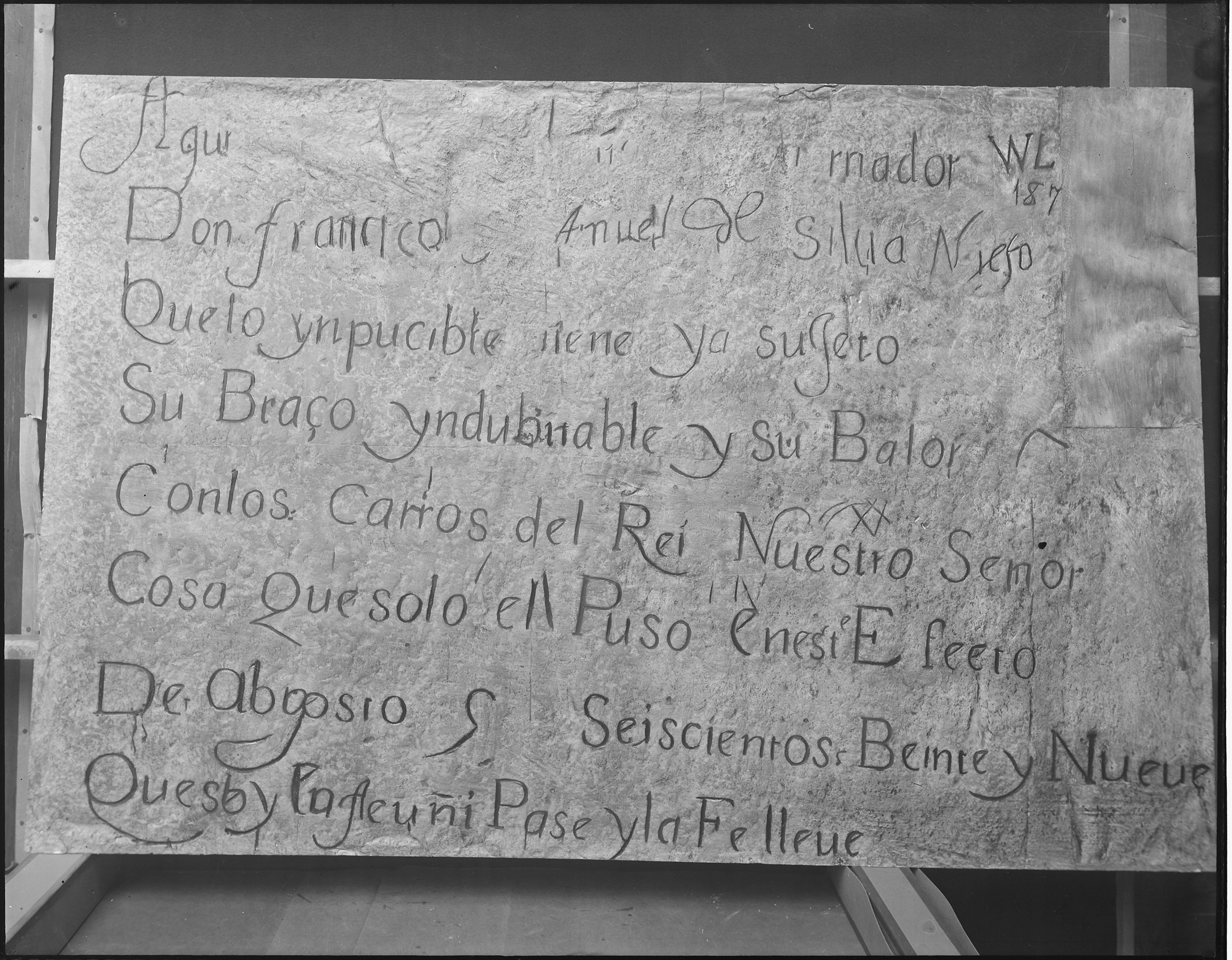
El Morro inscription

Here arrived the Senor and Governor
Don Francisco Manuel de Silva Nieto
Whose indubitable arm and valour
Have overcome the impossible
With the wagons of the King our Lord
A thing which he alone put into this effect
August 5, 1629 that one may well to Zuni
pass and carry the faith.

The peace with the people of Zuni did not last. The Franciscan missionary father Juan Letrado was killed in February 1632 one week after he arrived in Zuni. Another inscription on the rock dated 23 March 1632 was left by a party of soldiers en route to Zuni to avenge the father's death. At some time in his term of office, Silva with twenty soldiers escorted two priests on an expedition to the Navajos led by Quinia and Manases. The Navajo received the expedition peacefully, presumably wanting to maintain their independence while being able to trade with the Spanish, and allowed the priests to baptise them.

Father Estevan de Perea, who was the agent of the Inquisition in New Mexico, painted conditions during Silva's governorship in a poor light. He recorded that the local whites and half-castes were superstitious and influenced by Indian customs. Men were unfaithful to their wives, and the wives used Indian love-potions and spells in attempts to win back their affections. The fathers used harsh measures, asserting their authority to stamp out evil practices. According to one account, one of his servants murdered Silva in Zacatecas, possibly because of his closeness to the unpopular priests. His replacement arrived in March 1632.
