= Ázqueta =

- Village
- Ázqueta
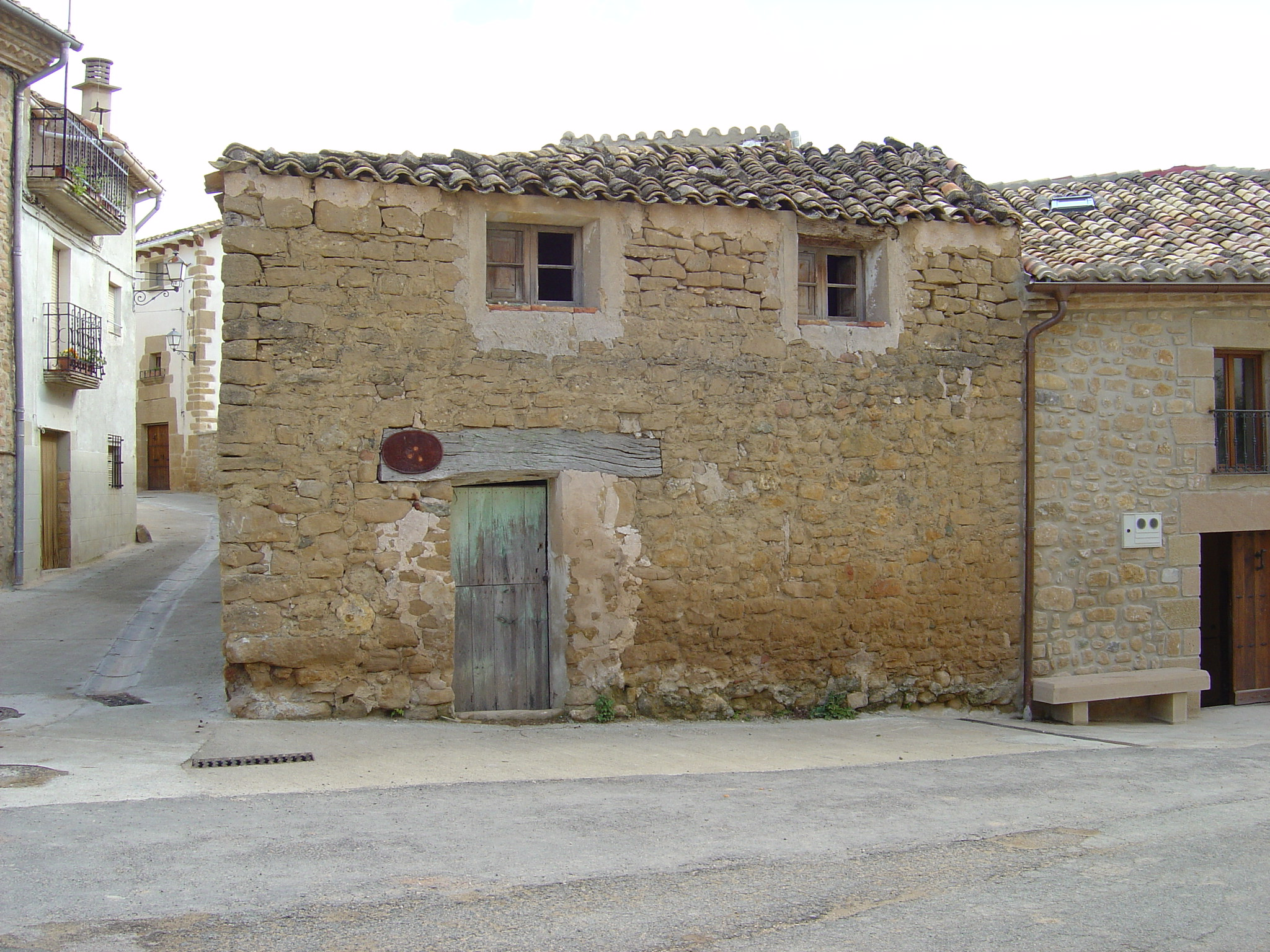

- Location within Navarre Location within Spain
- Coordinates: 42°38′08″N 2°05′12″W
- Country: Spain
- State/Parish: Navarre

Population (2014)
  - Total: 54
- Time zone: UTC+1 (CET)
  - Summer (DST): UTC+2 (CEST)

Ázqueta is a town in Navarre, Spain. It is located in the municipality of Igúzquiza. Ázqueta is located on the French Way path of the Camino de Santiago.
