= Lana, Navarre =

Town and municipality in Navarre, Spain

Coordinates: 42°42′22″N 2°14′49″W

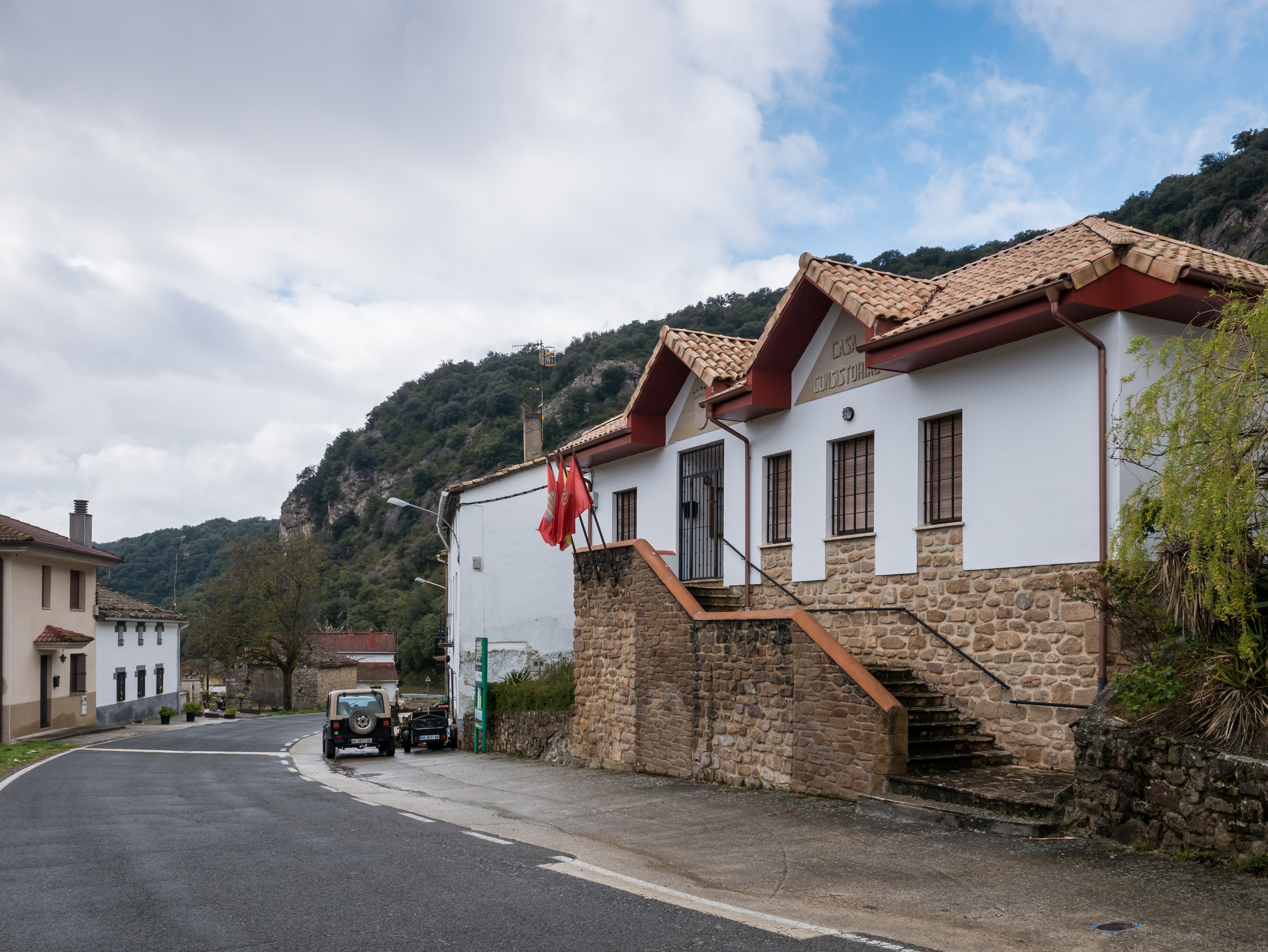
Town hall of the Lana municipality in Galbarra.

Lana is a town and municipality located in the province and autonomous community of Navarre, northern Spain with a population of 197 people.
