= Olejua =

Municipality of Spain

Coordinates: 42°37′27″N 2°08′25″W

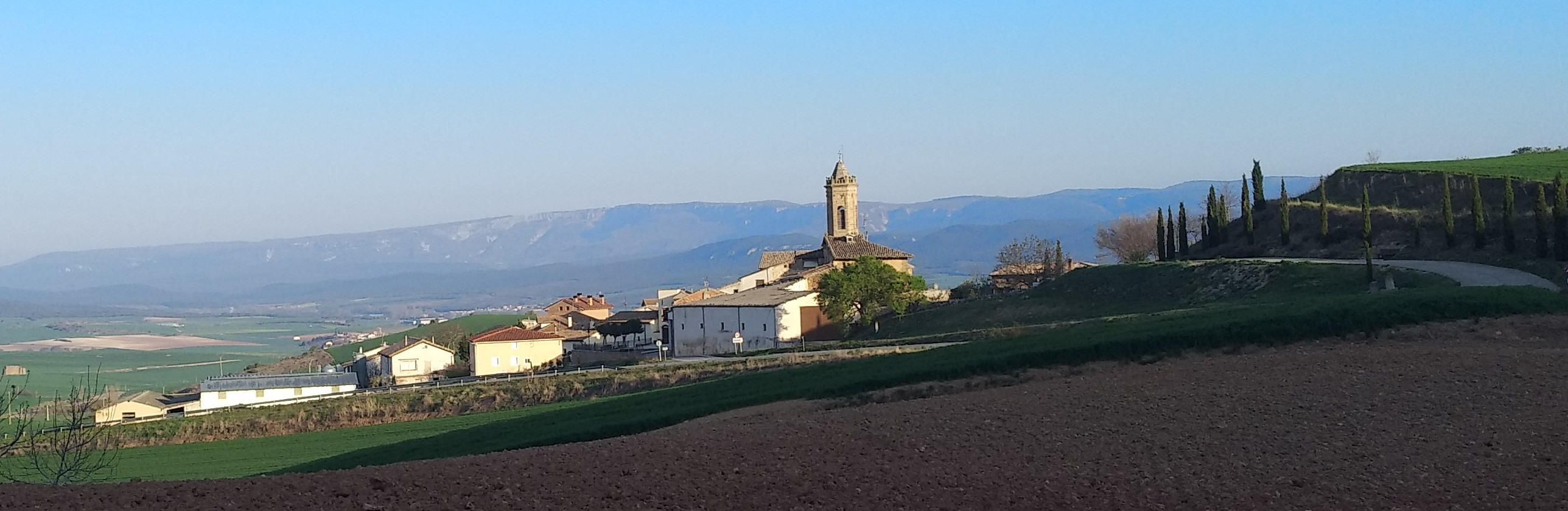
Partial view of Olejua

Olejua (Basque: Olexoa) is a town and municipality located in the province and autonomous community of Navarre, northern Spain.
