= Améscoa Baja =

Améscoa Baja Ameskoabarrena (Basque)
- Municipality
- Améscoa Baja
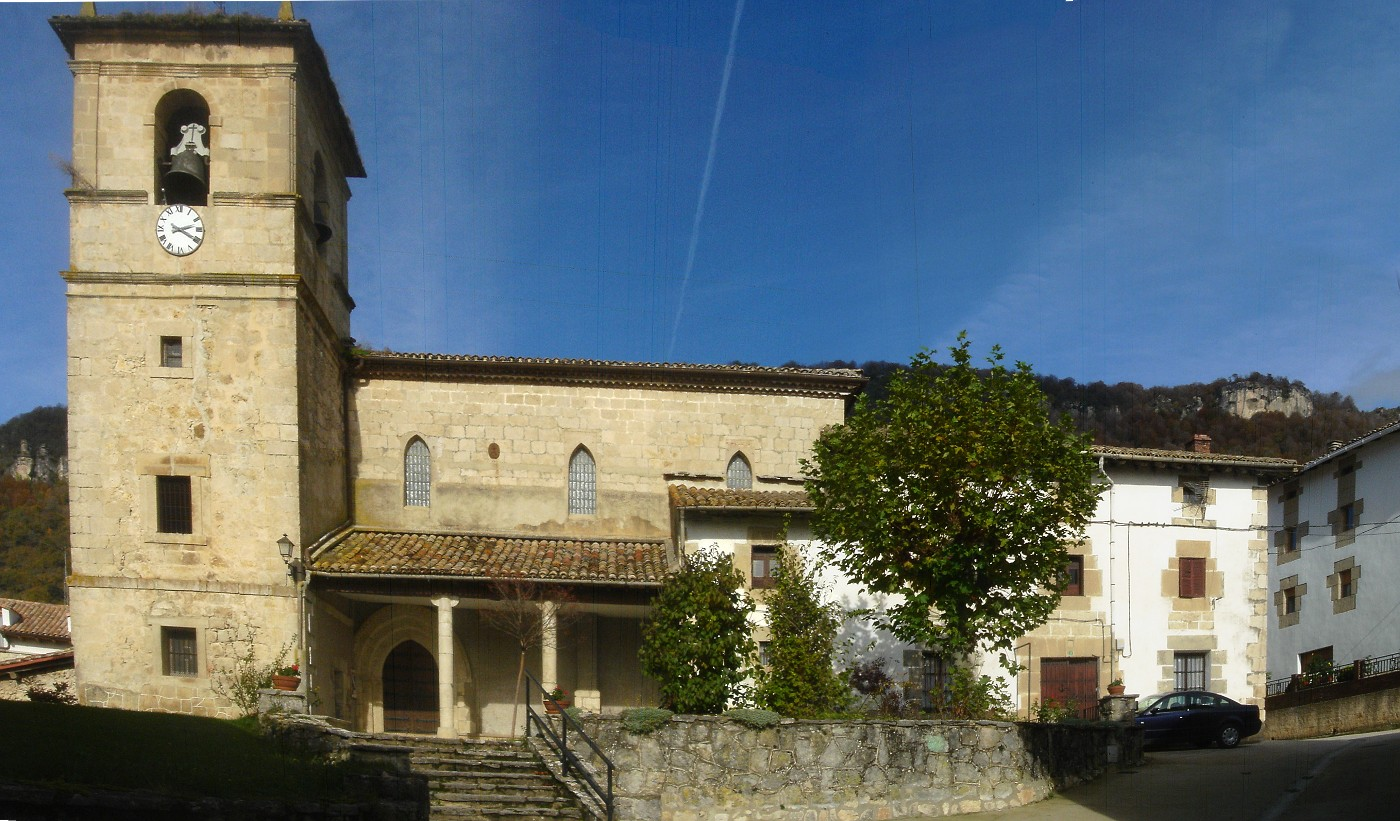
- Church of the hamlet of Bakedano

- Coat of arms

- Location of Améscoa Baja within Navarre Location of Améscoa Baja within Spain
- Coordinates: 42°46′27″N 2°07′58″W
- Country: Spain
- Autonomous Community: Navarre
- Province: Navarre
- Comarca: Estella Oriental

Government
  - Mayor (2023): Estíbaliz Erdocia Ormazabal (AIAB)

Area
  - Total: 30.2 km^{2} (11.7 sq mi)
- Elevation (AMSL): 563 m (1,847 ft)

Population (2025-01-01)
  - Total: 729
  - Density: 24.1/km^{2} (62.5/sq mi)
- Time zone: UTC+1 (CET)
  - Summer (DST): UTC+2 (CEST)
- Postal code: 31272
- Area code: +34 948
- Website: amescoabaja.org

Améscoa Baja (Basque: Ameskoabarrena) is a town and municipality located in the province and autonomous community of Navarre, northern Spain.
