= Goñi, Navarre =

Town in Spain

Coordinates: 42°51′06″N 1°54′13″W

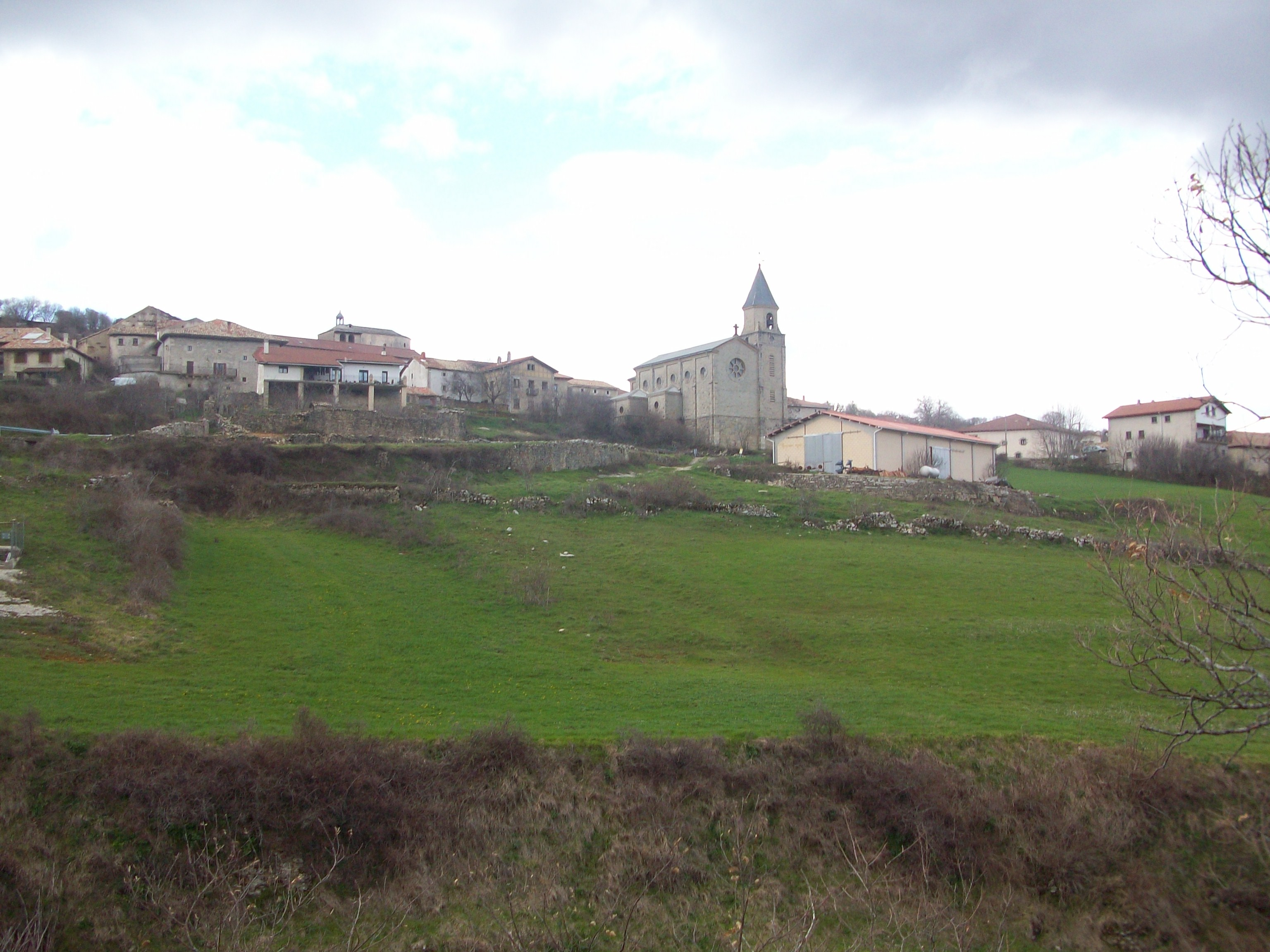
Partial view of Goñi, Navarre

Goñi is a town and municipality located in the province and autonomous community of Navarre, northern Spain.
