= Oco =

Town and municipality in Navarre, Spain

Coordinates: 42°38′23″N 2°9′49″W

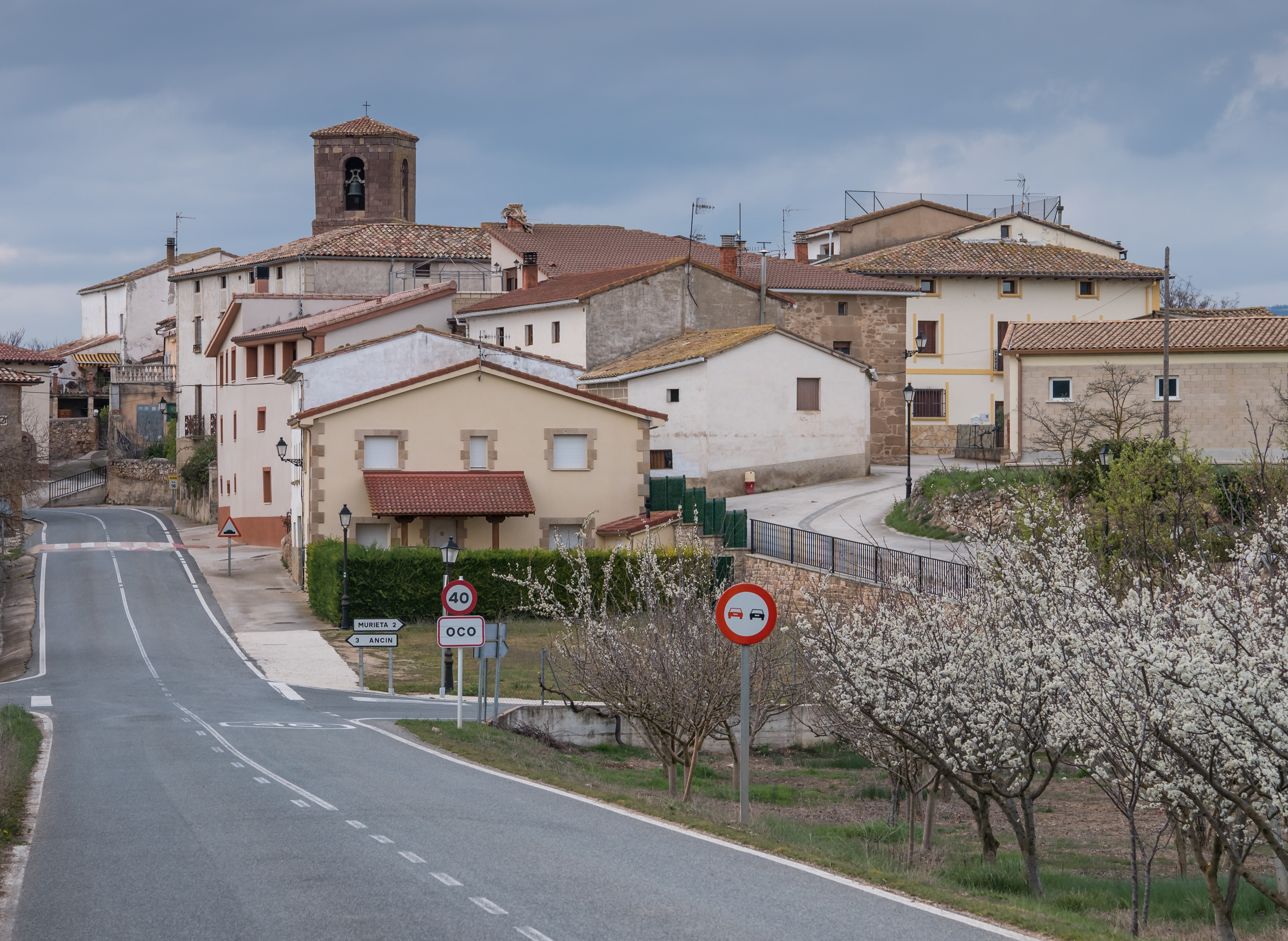
View of Oco

Oco (Basque: Oko) is a town and municipality located in the province and autonomous community of Navarre, northern Spain.

Oco was estimated to have 66 residents as of 2023.

Oco's warm season lasts three months, from June 13 to September 14, while its cool season lasts three and a half months, from November 15 to March 3.
