= Villatuerta =

Villatuerta: Villatuerta (Spanish) Villatuerta (Basque)
- Municipality
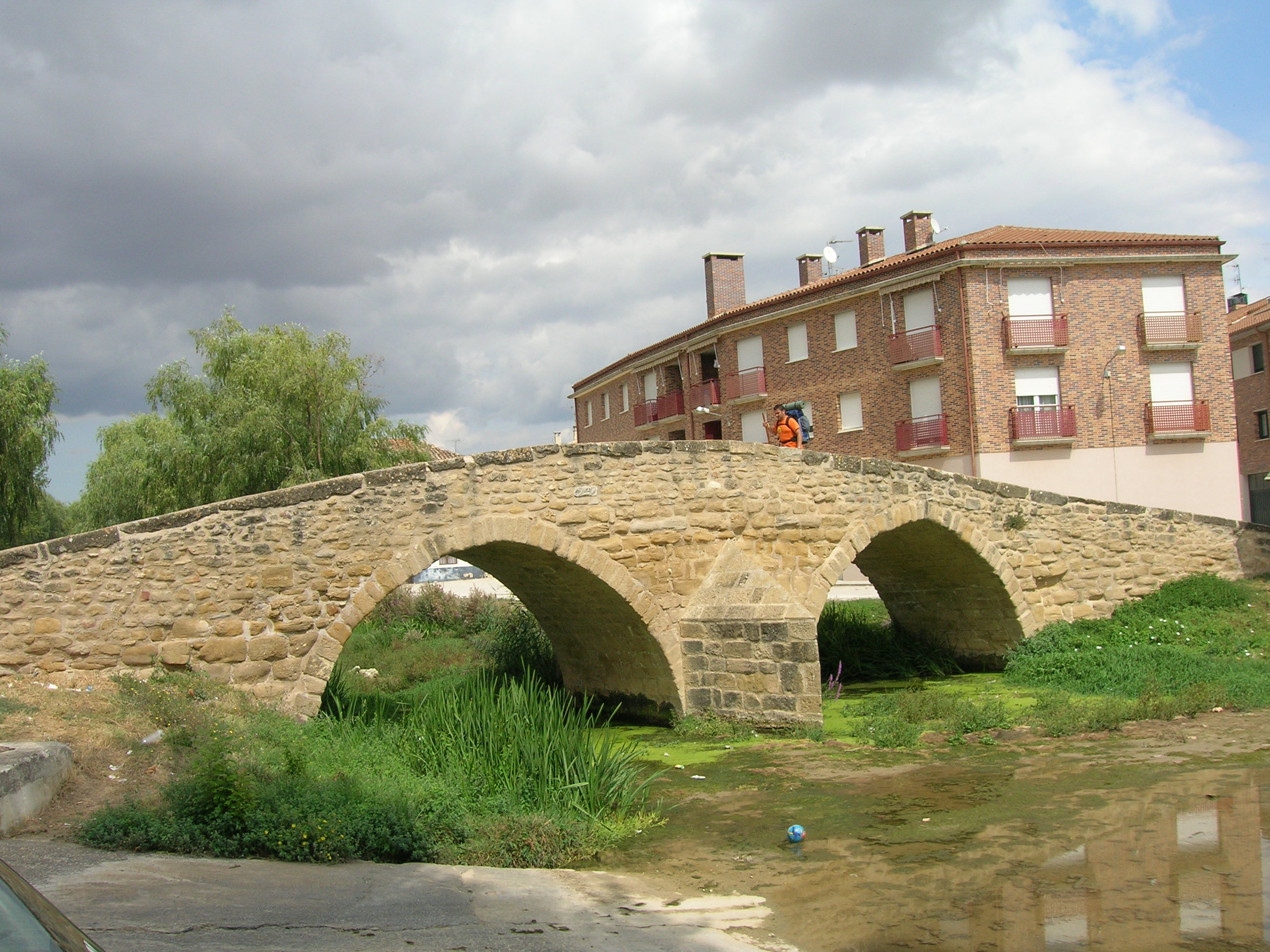
- Bridge over the Iranzu River

- Coat of arms

- Location within Spain Location within Navarre
- Coordinates: 42°39′34″N 1°59′36″W
- Country: Spain
- Autonomous Community: Navarre
- Merindad: Merindad de Estella
- Comarca: Estella Oriental
- Mancomunidad: Mancomunidad de Montejurra
- Municipality: Villatuerta

Government
  - Mayor: Asier Urra Ripa (Agrupación El Encinal)

Area
  - Total: 23.59 km^{2} (9.11 sq mi)
- Elevation: 440 m (1,440 ft)

Population (2025-01-01)
  - Total: 1,256
  - Density: 53.24/km^{2} (137.9/sq mi)
- Demonym(s): villatorcido, -da
- Website: www.villatuerta.org

Villatuerta (adaptation in Basque: Bilatorta) is a town and municipality located in the autonomous community of Navarre, Spain.
