= Estéban de Perea =

Spanish Franciscan friar

- Born: Villanueva del Fresno, Extremadura, Spain
- Died: 1638 or 1639; New Mexico
- Occupation: Friar
- Known for: Missionary activity
- Parents: Rodrigo Alonzo Perea (father); Inez Nunez (mother)

Estéban de Perea (or Estévan de Peréa) was a Spanish Franciscan friar who undertook missionary work in New Mexico, a province of New Spain, between 1610 and 1638. At times he was in conflict with the governors of the province. He has been called the "Father of the New Mexican Church".

== Origins ==
Estéban de Perea was born in Villanueva del Fresno, in Extremadura, Spain, near the Portuguese border. Both his parents were Portuguese and came from a region that was home to many Jews. The conquest of the Emirate of Granada, with its large populations of Muslims and Jews, had been completed in 1492. Those who refused to convert to Christianity had been deported from Spain. However, the Church was suspicious that some converts remained true to Jewish beliefs in private. In 1629 the Mexican Inquisition conducted a thorough inquiry into Perea's "purity of blood". Two witnesses testified that his mother's family was "tainted with new Christian blood", but the Franciscans chose to ignore this evidence.

== Early career ==
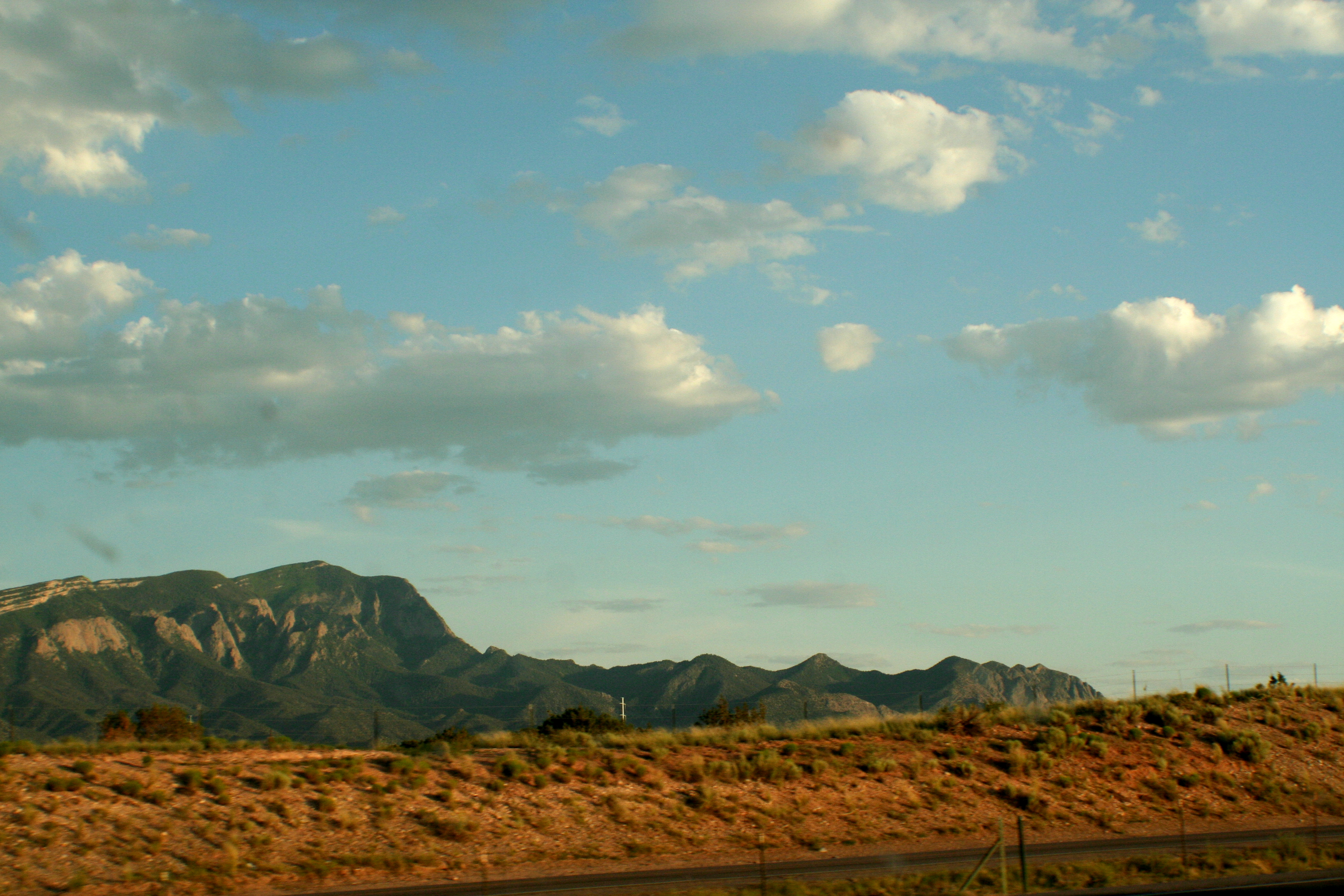
Sandia Mountains from a point close to the Sandia Pueblo

Fray Estéban de Perea arrived in New Mexico in 1610, and soon after established the mission of Nuestra Señora de los Dolores (Our Lady of Sorrows) at Sandia Pueblo, to the south of Santa Fe. The viceroy received a complaint about the mission at Sandía from the municipality of Santa Fe, which said that the mission had taken so much of the limited supply of iron that there was not enough left for civilian needs. (Note: There was a constant shortage of iron in the colony. In 1639 the Santa Fe cabildo reported "Iron tools for cultivating and ploughing the land are especially needed ... but no iron has been sent since the year 1628. Consequently we are perishing, without a pound of iron or a plough." The Indians acquired iron and the skills of blacksmithing. When the Spanish returned to New Mexico after the Pueblo Revolt of 1680-1692, they found that the local people had set up and were operating a fully functioning blacksmith shop in Sandía Pueblo.) After visiting the Hopi people, Perea wrote enthusiastically about the industrious and moral people, with well-built houses, in a land that resembled Spain.

The Church assumed that the main objective in New Mexico was to convert the Indians, and the civil power existed only in order to provide protection and to support this goal. As chief judge and head of the army, the governor had equal powers but different objectives, so clashes were inevitable. On 12 August 1613 the Franciscan leader Fray Isidro Ordóñez and his followers arrested the governor Pedro de Peralta and had him chained and imprisoned in the mission at Sandía. His jailer was Fray Estéban de Perea, who disapproved but obeyed. The Custodia de la Conversión de San Pablo del Nuevo México, a religious province, was set up by Franciscan friars around 1616 or 1617. Perea was elected first custodian, becoming the head of the Church in New Mexico. Perea had many disputes with the temporal governor Juan de Eulate from 1618 to 1626. In 1620 the Viceroy of New Spain heard complaints from the Indians of abuses of power, and sent orders regulating the treatment of Indians to both Perea and Juan de Eulate.

In 1620 Perea reported missionary progress to Mexico City, and based on this six friars were dispatched to New Mexico with the annual supply caravan of 1621. Perea left office that year, but remained in New Mexico. Tensions between church and state rose to such a level that in 1622 the Franciscans considered abandoning New Mexico altogether, and only decided to remain due to Perea's frantic pleas. In 1626 Fray Alonso de Benavides was appointed custodian and also commissary of the Holy Office of the Inquisition for the province, giving him power second only to that of the temporal governor (and at times greater). Perea temporarily left New Mexico. Benavides visited all the pueblos, found that the friars were succeeding in their efforts to convert the local people, and in 1626 asked for more missionaries. King Philip IV of Spain, who valued the land mainly because of the number of souls to be saved, ordered the dispatch of thirty more friars.

== Second term as custodian ==
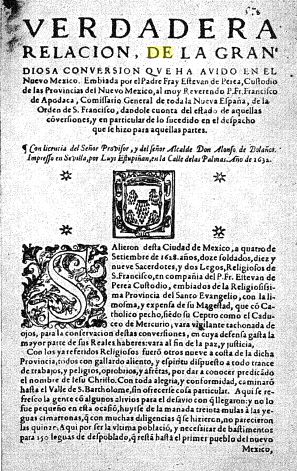
Cover of Perea's 1632 account of the conversions in New Mexico

In 1629, Perea returned to New Mexico with about thirty friars and several lay brothers to undertake missionary work, possibly traveling with the new governor of New Mexico, Captain Don Francisco Manuel de Silva Nieto. He was sent to New Mexico by the Franciscan Province of the Holy Gospel, based in Mexico City. He was special inspector, the agent of the Inquisition, and also custodian. He replaced Benavides. Governor Silva was more friendly to the friars than his predecessors had been, and helped them in their work. By the end of 1629 New Mexico had about thirty-five missions served by forty-six friars for a population of around 35,000 converted Indians.

Perea brought with him a letter of inquiry from the archbishop in Mexico City, following up on a letter from the confessor of the Spanish nun María de Ágreda. She had been falling into trances in which she reported that she had been transported to some people called Jumanos, to whom she preached. Although she did not name the places she had visited, the priests in Spain thought it sounded like New Mexico. As it happened, several groups of Jumanos Indians had shown up at the New Mexico missions, saying they had been visited by a young woman in blue and that she had told them to ask for friars to be sent to them from the missions. The friars immediately connected the two, and investigations began to verify the miracle.

On 23 June 1629 Perea accompanied Silva on an expedition to Zuni with thirty soldiers, ten wagons, four hundred cavalry horses and a group of priests. Perhaps due to the size of the force, they were well received by the local people of Zuni. The soldiers made a show of great respect to the friars, going down on their knees and kissing their feet, and told the Indians they should do the same. Perea took the welcome to mean that "God hath already disposed this vineyard." A cross and a great platform were built in the Hawikuh plaza. The next day the Spanish conducted Mass and baptized many of the Zuni leaders. Although things seemed to be going very well, Perea noted that the Indians "are very observant of superstitious idolatry. ...They have their gods in the mountains, in the rivers, in the harvests, and in their houses."

A house was bought for the friars, serving as the first church in the province. Silva helped the Franciscans to set up other missions near Zuni. One was established at Hawwikku, about 15 miles (24 km) down the Zuni valley, and another farther west at the Hopi village of Awatobi. Perea and Governor Silva gave Fray Juan Ramírez an escort further west to Ácoma. (Note: The historian Charles Fletcher Lummis gives a more romantic account in his 1931 The Spanish pioneers and the California missions. According to Lummis, Fray Juan Ramirez refused an escort and travelled to Ácoma from Santa Fe alone and on foot, with no other weapon than a crucifix. On arrival he was attacked by savage Indians, but when he performed what seemed to be a miracle he was accepted by them and over time converted them into the gentlest Indians in New Mexico.) The peace with the people of Zuni did not last. The Franciscan missionary father Juan Letrado was killed in February 1632 one week after he arrived in Zuni. In March 1632 a party of soldiers was sent to Zuni to avenge the missionary's death.

Perea painted conditions during Silva's governorship in a poor light. He recorded that the local whites and half-castes were superstitious and influenced by Indian customs. Men were unfaithful to their wives, and the wives used Indian love-potions and spells in attempts to win back their affections. Peyote was being illegally trafficked in New Mexico. Perea recorded in 1631 that "Ana Cadimo [a mestiza] ... says that it was about a year ago that the Indians ... were telling her that she was bewitched, and that she should take peiote and that with it she would see [by means of a vision] the person who had bewitched her and done her evil." The fathers had to use harsh measures, asserting their authority to stamp out evil practices.

== Later years ==
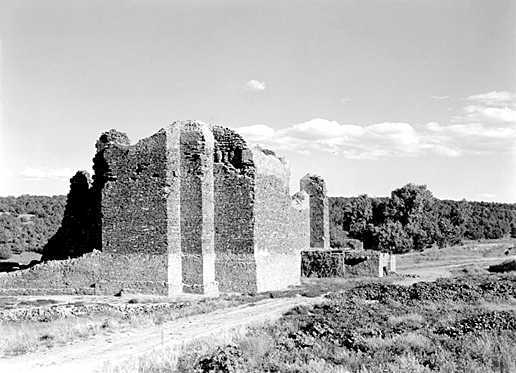
Quarai Mission Church in Salinas Pueblo Missions National Monument, New Mexico

Perea remained custodian until 1631. In 1632 he published an account of the missionary activity in New Mexico. In 1633, Perea was serving as a missionary at Quarai, where he wrote that the governor was letting colonists encroach on the jointly owned fields of the Indians and of the mission. He remained with the Franciscans until his death in New Mexico in 1638 or 1639. He was buried in the mission that he had founded at Sandía.

Opposed to forced conversion, as were most missionaries, he said: "With suavity and mildness an obstinate spirit can better be reclaimed than with violence and rigor." According to France V. Scholes, "Perea was one of the great figures in the history of the Church in New Mexico. For some thirty years, except for the brief period from 1626 to 1629, he was the dominant figure in the religious life of the province. ...His long years of service and his paramount influence give him a pre-eminent position in New Mexican history, a position greater than that of Benavides. Perea, more than any other friar, deserves the honor of being called the Father of the New Mexican Church."

== Bibliography ==
- Perea, Estevan de (1632). Verdadera relacion, de la grandiosa conversion qve ha avido en el Nuevo Mexico: Embiada por el padre fray Estevan de Perea, custodio de las provincias del Nuevo Mexico, al muy reverendo P. Fr. Francisco de Apodaca, comissario general de toda la Nueva España, de la orden de S. Francisco, dandole ... Impresso por L. Estupiñan.
