= Sorlada =

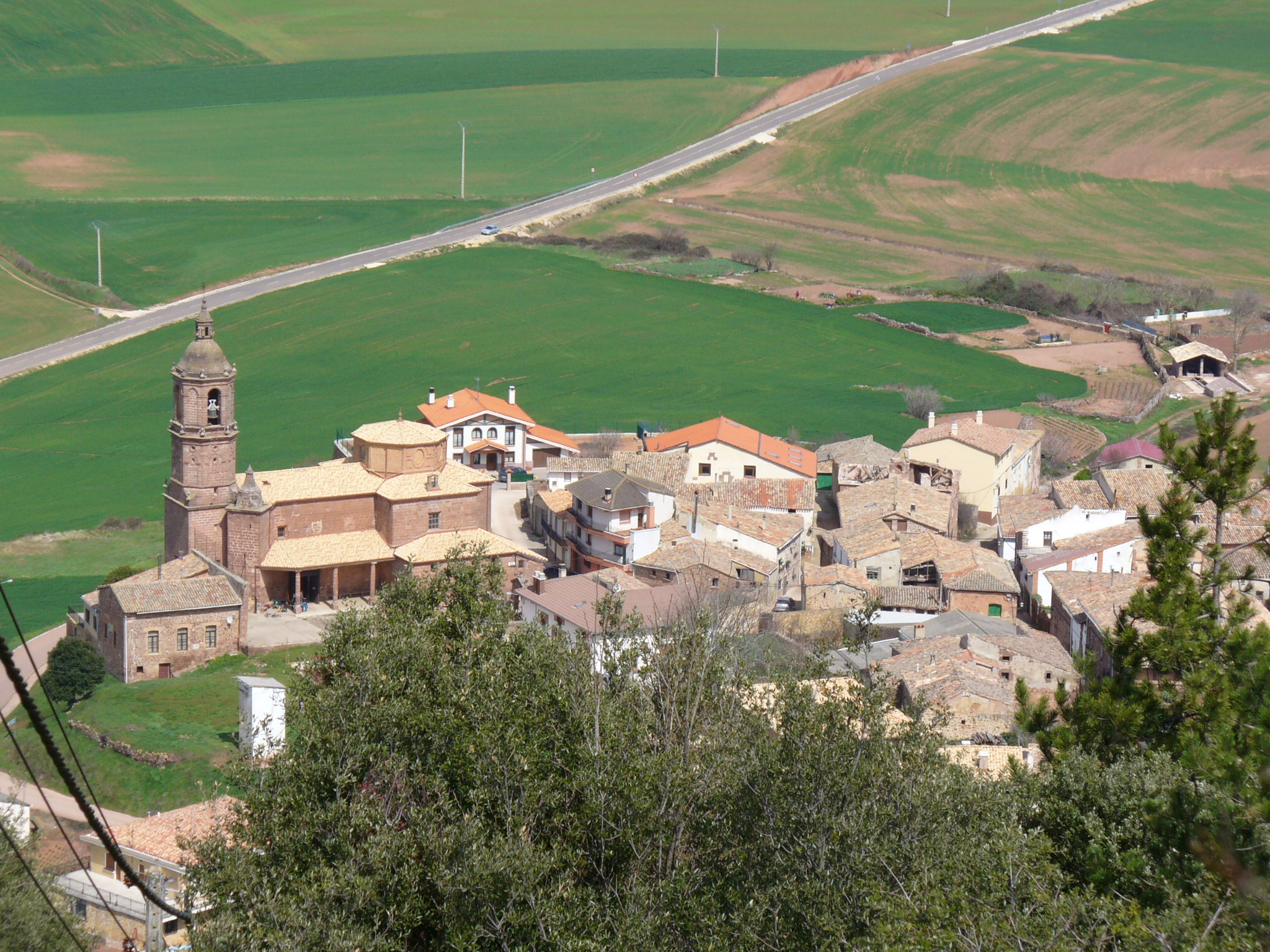
- Aerial view of the town with the Church of San Gregorio Ostiense, Sorlada

- Coat of arms

- Location of Sorlada within Navarre Location of Doneztebe within Spain
- Coordinates: 42°36′54″N 2°12′55″W
- Country: Spain
- Autonomous community: Navarra

Government
  - Mayor: Joaquín Lana Marquínez

Area
  - Total: 6.41 km^{2} (2.47 sq mi)
- Elevation: 574 m (1,883 ft)

Population (2025-01-01)
  - Total: 39
  - Density: 6.1/km^{2} (16/sq mi)
- Time zone: UTC+1 (CET)
  - Summer (DST): UTC+2 (CEST)
- Postal code: 31219

Sorlada is a town and municipality located in the province and autonomous community of Navarre, northern Spain. According to 2017 census, it had 52 inhabitants.
