= Nazar, Navarre =

Nazar
- Municipality
- Coat of arms

- Location in Navarre
- Coordinates: 42°38′N 2°16′W
- Country: Spain
- Autonomous Community: Navarre
- Merindad: Estella

Government
  - Mayor: Alfredo Montoya Bujanda

Area
  - Total: 6.43 km^{2} (2.48 sq mi)
- Elevation: 737 m (2,418 ft)

Population (2025-01-01)
  - Total: 40
  - Density: 6.2/km^{2} (16/sq mi)
- Time zone: UTC+1 (CET)
- Postal code: 31282
- Official language(s): Basque, Spanish

Nazar is a town and municipality located in the province and autonomous community of Navarre, northern Spain.

This town is close to the Codés mountain range, part of which falls within its municipal term.
