= Alonso de Benavides =

Portuguese missionary

The Reverend Alonso de Benavides OFM
- Born: c. 1578; São Miguel Island, Azores, Portugal
- Died: 1635 in a sea journey
- Occupation: Franciscan missionary

Alonso de Benavides (Portuguese: Afonso de Benavides; c. 1578–1635) was a Portuguese Franciscan missionary active in New Mexico in the early part of the seventeenth century.

His use of the term Navaho is said to be the first printed reference.

== Life ==
He was born on São Miguel Island, Azores, Portugal. He came to New Spain in 1598, and professed in the Franciscan convent of Mexico in 1603.

After acting as master of novices at the convent of Puebla, he became Custos of the Missions of New Mexico, 1626–9. He founded a mission in 1627 at what is now Santa Clara Pueblo, New Mexico. With the support of the King of Spain, and helped by Fray Estéban de Perea, he secured a reinforcement of missionaries there.

In writings from the 1620s, Benavides described seizing "more than a thousand idols of wood" from Pueblo homes and burning the sacred objects in front of the natives.

He travelled to Spain in 1630 and there was in communication with María de Ágreda. He acted as confessor to Francisco de Melo, 1633–5. Back in Spain in 1635, he was appointed auxiliary Archbishop of Goa; he died on the eastward sea journey.

== Works ==
In order to raise interest in New Mexico he wrote and published two booklets, exaggerated in regard to the number of Indians, but otherwise of value for the ethnography and ethnology of New Mexico. His account of the numbers of people and villages may have been influenced by data taken from Antonio de Espejo.

He published "Relación de los grandes Tesoros espirituales y temporales descubiertos con el auxilio de Dios en el Nuevo Mexico" in 1630, and is best known through the "Memorial que Fray Juan de Santander de la orden de San Francisco &c. presenta á la Majestad Católica del Rey" (Madrid, 1630, translated into various languages and republished).

== Sources ==
- Memorial (Madrid, 1630);
- Pinelo, Epitome (Madrid, 1738), II;
- Beristain, Biblioteca, etc. Mexico, 1816), II;
- Vetancourt, Teatro mexican (Mexico, 1698); especially Cronica de la Provincia del Santo Evangelio de Mexico; bandelier, Final Report, etc., I and II.
