= Etayo =

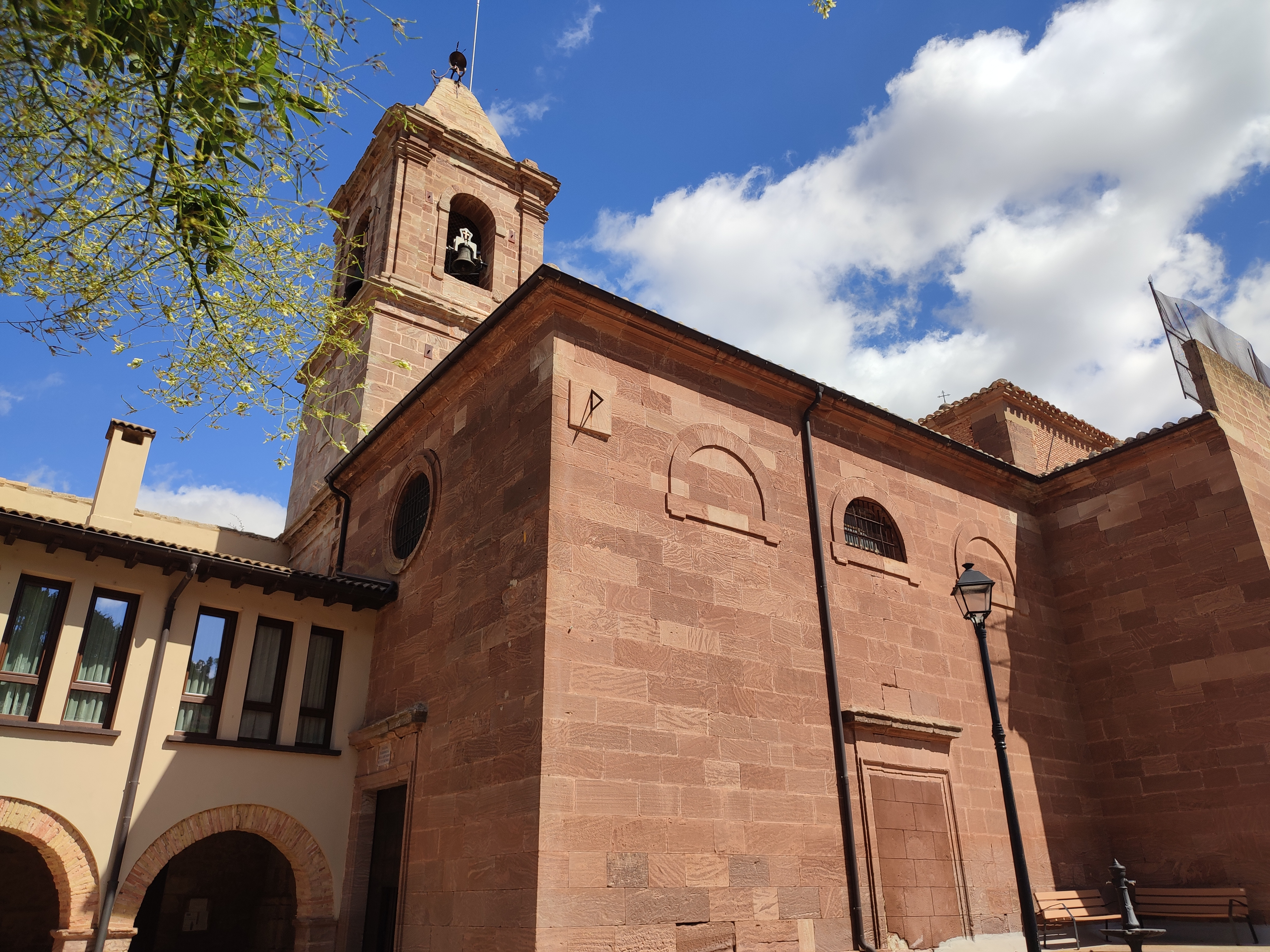
- Church of Our Lady of the Assumption in Etayo

- Coat of arms

- Location of Etayo within Navarre Location of Etayo within Spain
- Coordinates: 42°37′00″N 2°09′14″W
- Country: Spain
- Autonomous community: Navarra

Government
  - Mayor: Felipe Landa Acedo

Area
  - Total: 13.02 km^{2} (5.03 sq mi)
- Elevation: 595 m (1,952 ft)

Population (2025-01-01)
  - Total: 72
  - Density: 5.5/km^{2} (14/sq mi)
- Time zone: UTC+1 (CET)
  - Summer (DST): UTC+2 (CEST)
- Postal code: 31281

Etayo (Basque: Etaio) is a town and municipality located in the province and autonomous community of Navarre, northern Spain.
