= Arellano, Navarre =

Town in Navarre, Spain

Coordinates: 42°36′22″N 2°2′49″W

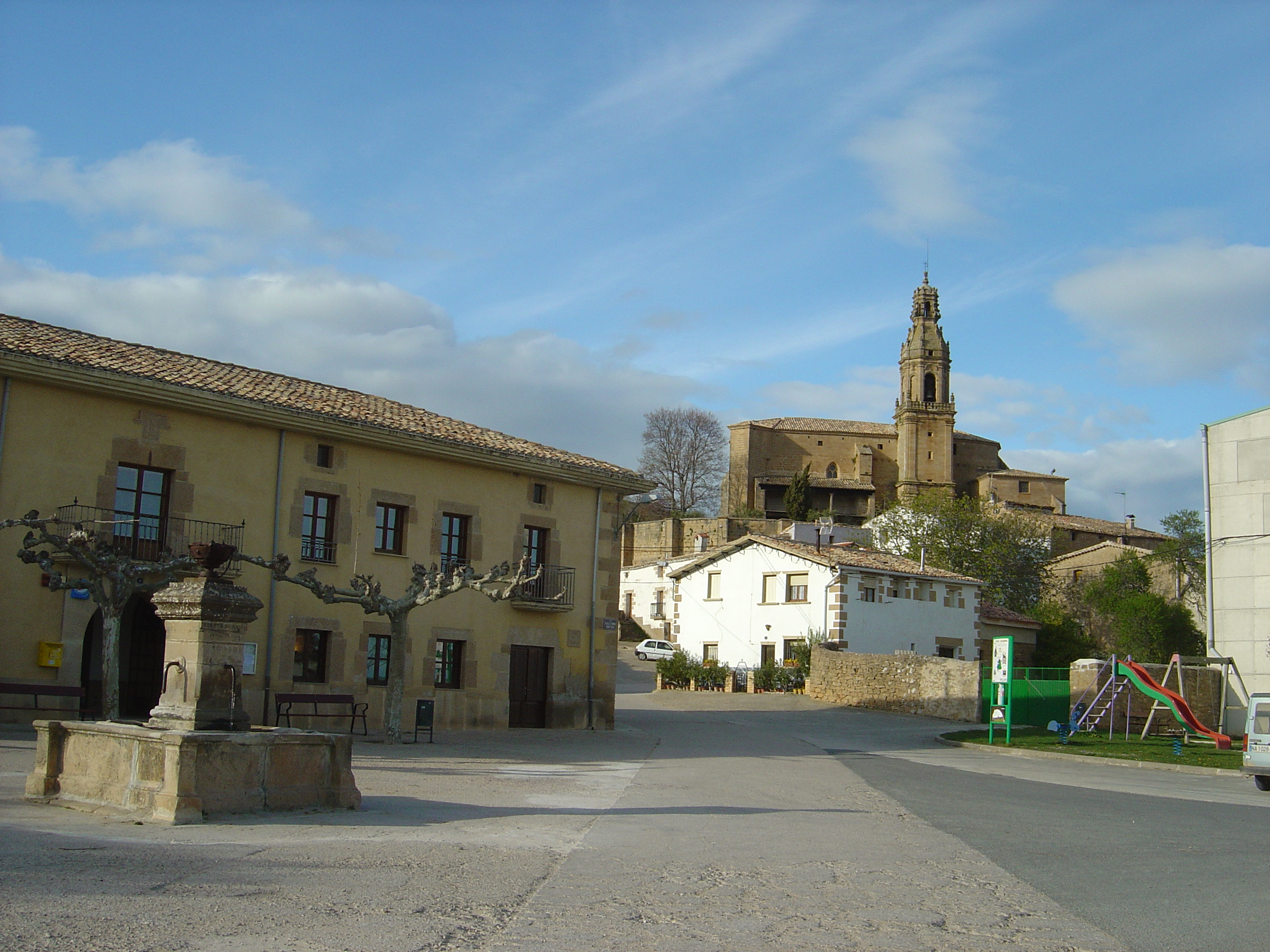

Arellano's coat of arms

Arellano is a town and municipality located in the province and autonomous community of Navarre, northern Spain.
