= Igúzquiza =

Municipality and town of Spain

Coordinates: 42°38′47″N 2°05′07″W

Igúzquiza Iguzkitza
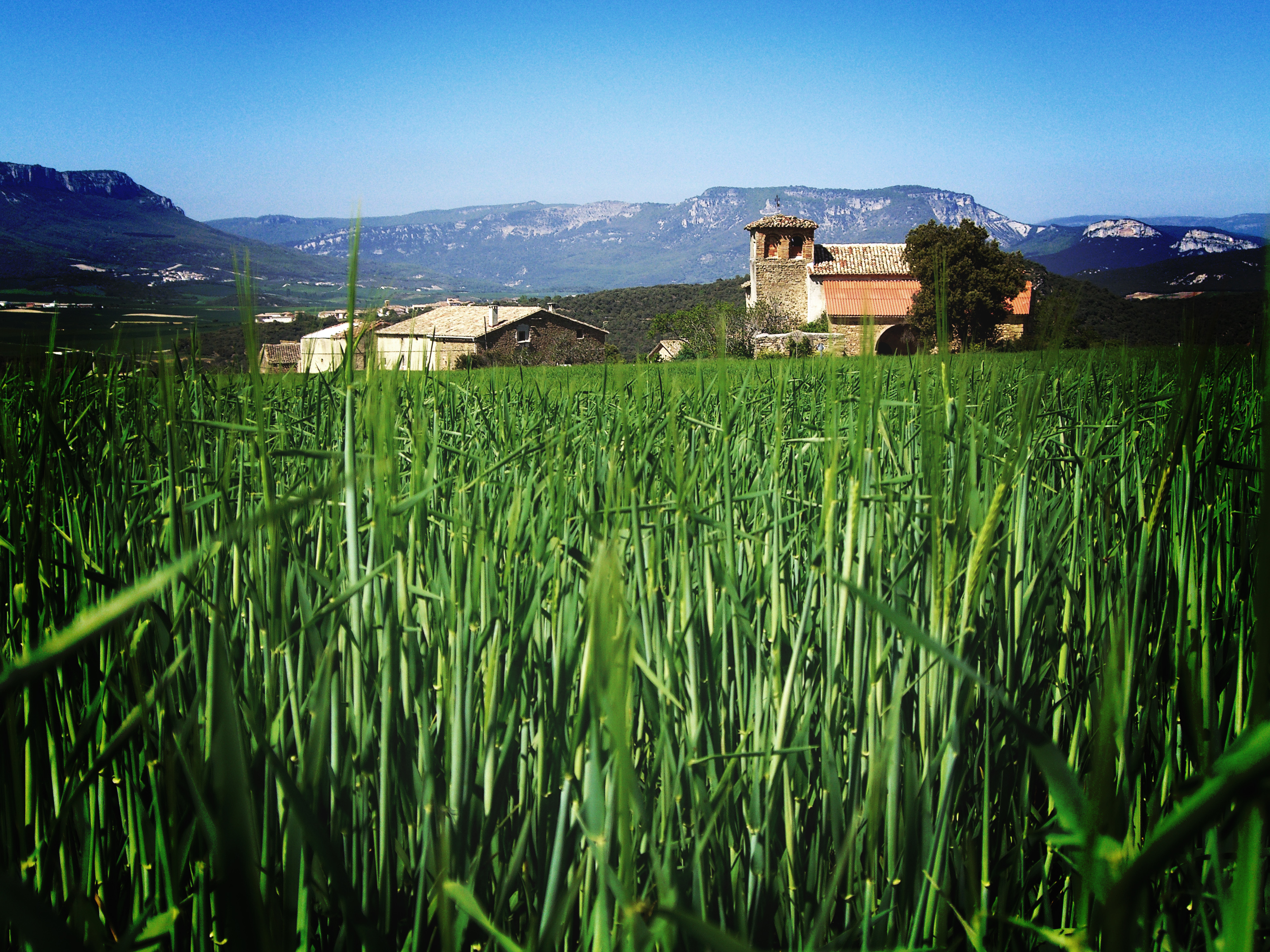

- Coat of arms
- Interactive map of Igúzquiza

Igúzquiza (Basque: Iguzkitza) is a town and municipality located in the province and autonomous community of Navarre, northern Spain. Igúzquiza is 4 km from Estella and 50.03 km from the capital of the community, Pamplona. It covers an area of 18.02 km^{2} (roughly 6.95 miles) and Its population in 2023 was 301 inhabitants.

== Municipality ==
The municipality of Igúzquiza is composed of the councils and places of Ázqueta, Igúzquiza, Labeaga, and Urbiola. This district has functioned as an independent municipality since 1846, the year in which the municipality of Valle de Santesteban de la Solana, to which the entire set of localities belonged, ceased to exist. This included the present municipalities of Arróniz, Barbarin, Luquin, and Villamayor de Monjardín.

== Lordship ==
The ancient lordship of Igúzquiza was perpetually held by the noble Medrano family. These lords of Igúzquiza were one of 74 nobles who had a seat in the noble estate of the Courts of Navarre within the ancient nobility. The House of Medrano is considered the oldest of nobility, and as such was summoned to the noble estate of the Courts of Navarre in the year 1580.

== Coat of arms ==
Iguzquiza uses the same arms as the shield of Navarre, except for the central emerald in the middle.

As reported by the Grand Encyclopedia of Navarre:

'This coat of arms was characteristic of the valley of Santesteban de la Solana, and when Arróniz, Villamayor, Barbarin, and Luquin formed independent municipalities, the remaining populations continued to be administratively united and used the arms of the entire valley.'

== Geography ==
Igúzquiza is a village located on flat terrain, surrounded by a large oak forest that, in the late 18th century, extended for about a league and a half. To the north flows the Ega River, and perched above its escarpment stands a stone and brick castle belonging to the Vélaz de Medrano family, who were the lords of the area.

It borders to the north with the district of Metauten and Allín, to the east with Ayegui, to the south with Dicastillo, the Montejurra communal land, and Luquin, and finally, to the west with Villamayor de Monjardín and Abáigar. The Ega River crosses the territory on the northern part, also serving as the boundary with Metauten, situated on its right bank.

== Toponym ==
It is believed that the toponym Igúzquiza derives from the Basque 'iguzki,' which means 'sun,' and the augmentative suffix '-tza.' Julio Caro Baroja in his Ethnographic History of Navarre states that Igúzquiza means "rock of the sun" or "rock of the east."

== Buildings ==
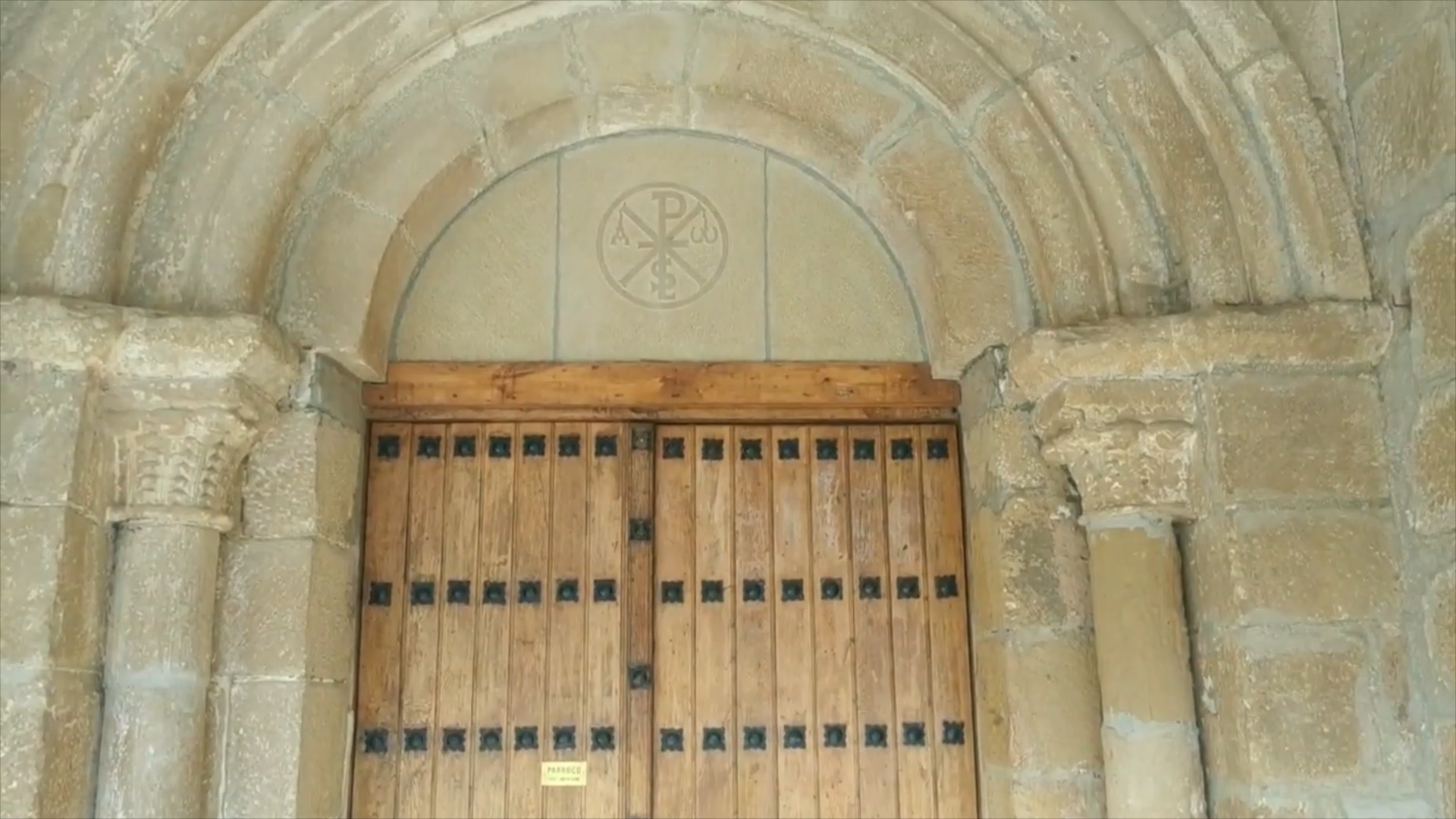
The Presbytery of Iguzquiza, Navarre.

Significant buildings in Igúzquiza include:

- The parish church of San Andrés de Igúzquiza was built in the 12th century, under the jurisdiction of the Metropolitan Archdiocese of Pamplona y Tudela and deanery of Estella-Viana. The parish church of Igúzquiza bears the name of the apostle San Andres and boasts valuable Romanesque lineage and the chi-rho or labarum of Constantine.
- The Castle of Vélaz de Medrano was built in the 11th century, then rebuilt as a palace in the 15th century by Ferrán Vélaz de Medrano, it is the most significant monument in Igúzquiza, overlooking the town. This Palace stands out as one of Igúzquiza's key landmarks, perched on a hill just outside the village.
- Casa Txintxiligaña.
- Casa Vélez.
- The Hermitage of the Immaculate was built in the 17th century.
