= Eulate =

Municipality of Spain

Coordinates: 42°46′35″N 2°12′22″W

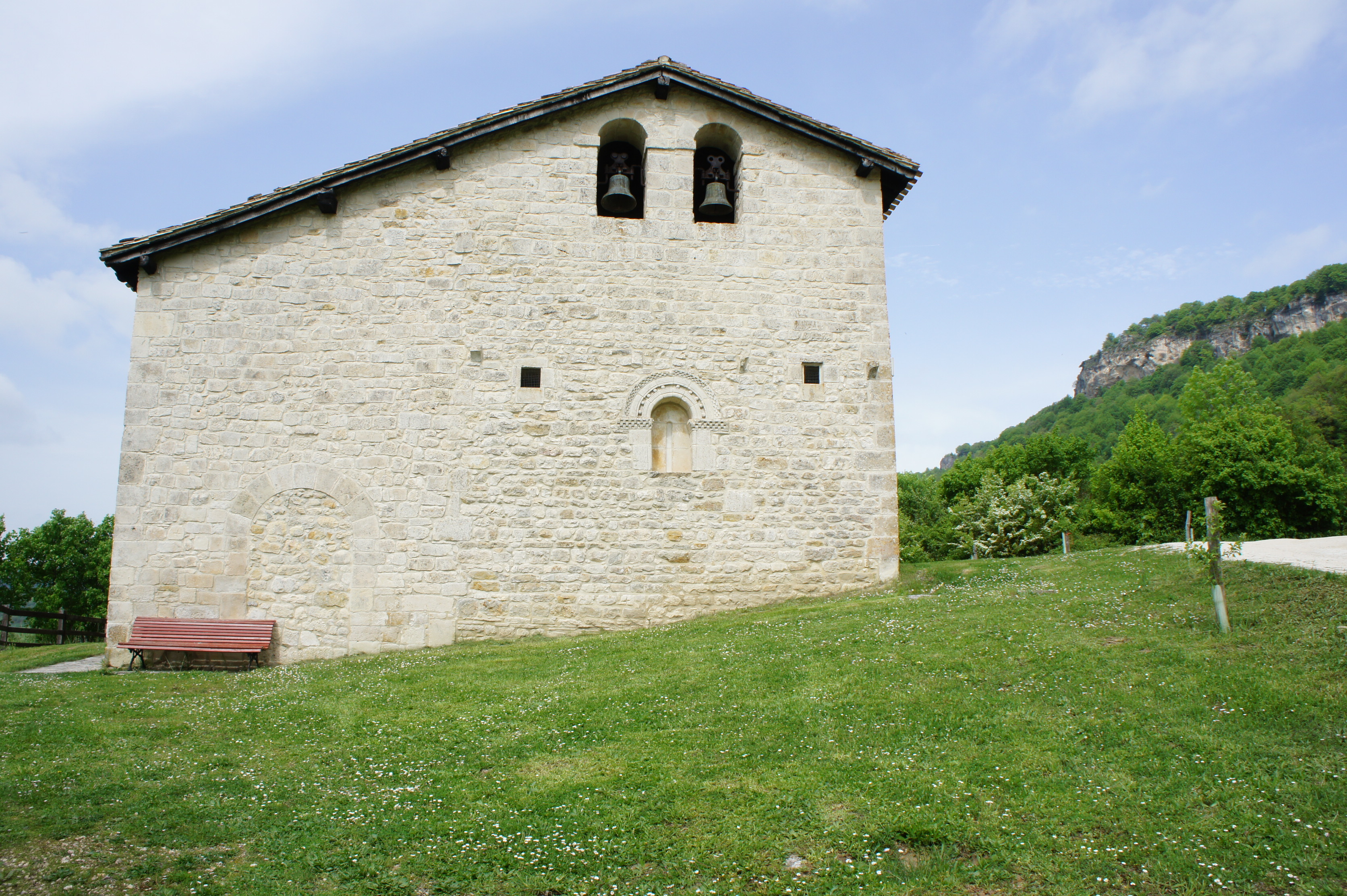
Hermitage of San Juan Bautista in Eulate, Navarra

Eulate is a town and municipality located in the province and autonomous community of Navarre, northern Spain.
