= Murieta =

Municipality in Spain

Coordinates: 42°39′34″N 2°09′23″W

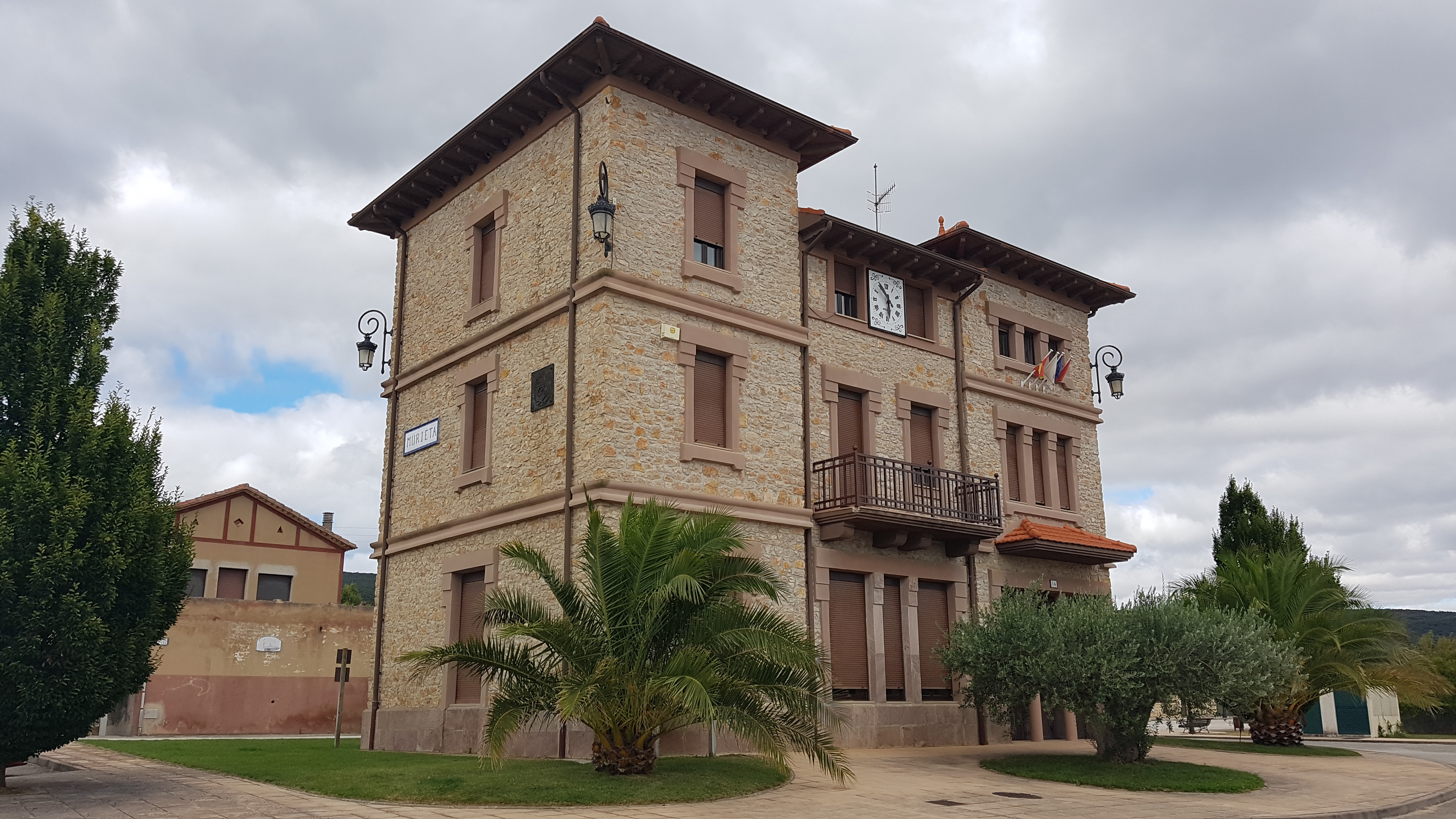
Town Hall of Murieta

Murieta is a town and municipality located in the province and autonomous community of Navarre, northern Spain. It covers an area of 4,51 km^{2}. In 2006, it had a population of 371, giving the average population density of 70,29 persons per km^{2}.
