= Luquin =

Town and municipality in Navarre, Spain

Coordinates: 42°36′42″N 2°05′57″W

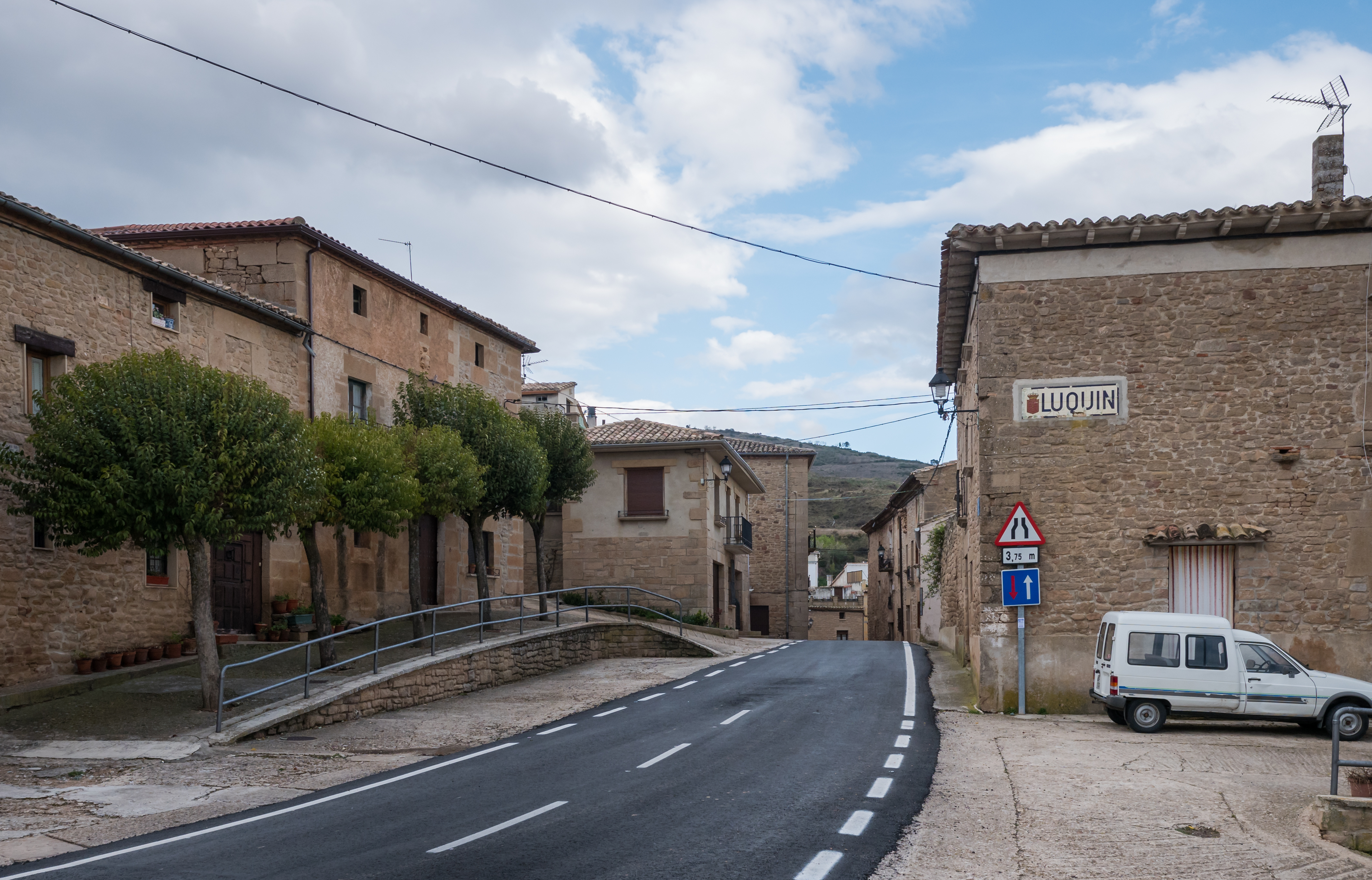
Houses and road in Luquin. Navarre, Spain

Luquin (Basque: Lukin) is a town and municipality located in the province and autonomous community of Navarre, northern Spain. It is thought to be one of the few villages with a community owned swimming pool
