= Salinas de Oro – Jaitz =

Town and municipality in northern Spain

Coordinates: 42°46′31″N 1°53′17″W

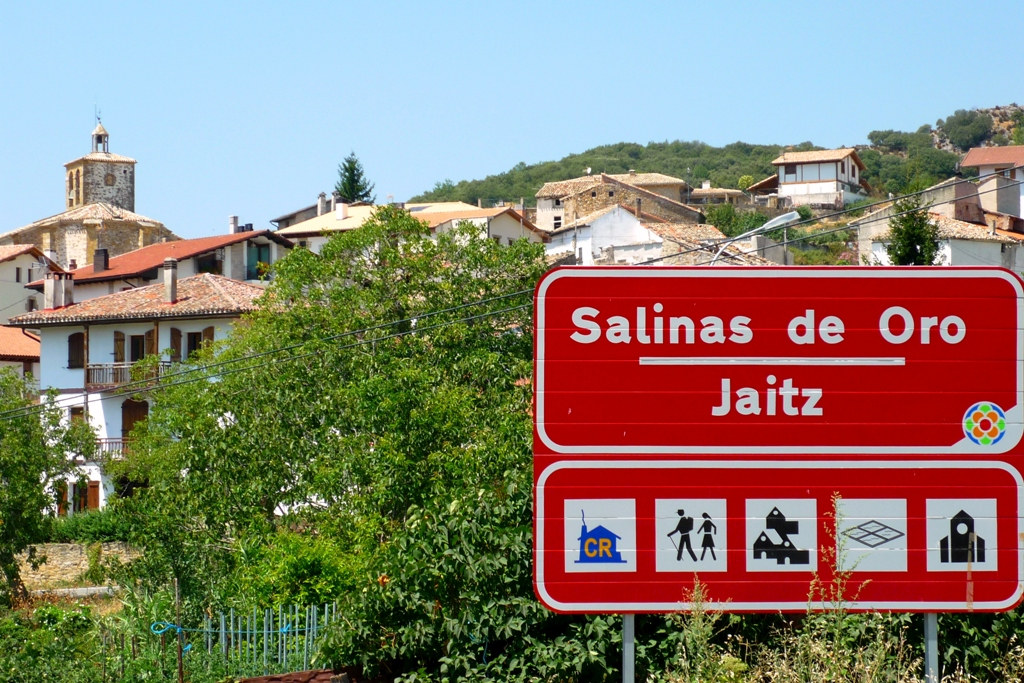
Salinas de oro

Salinas de Oro (Basque: Jaitz) is a town and municipality located in the province and autonomous community of Navarre, northern Spain.
