= Basque surnames =

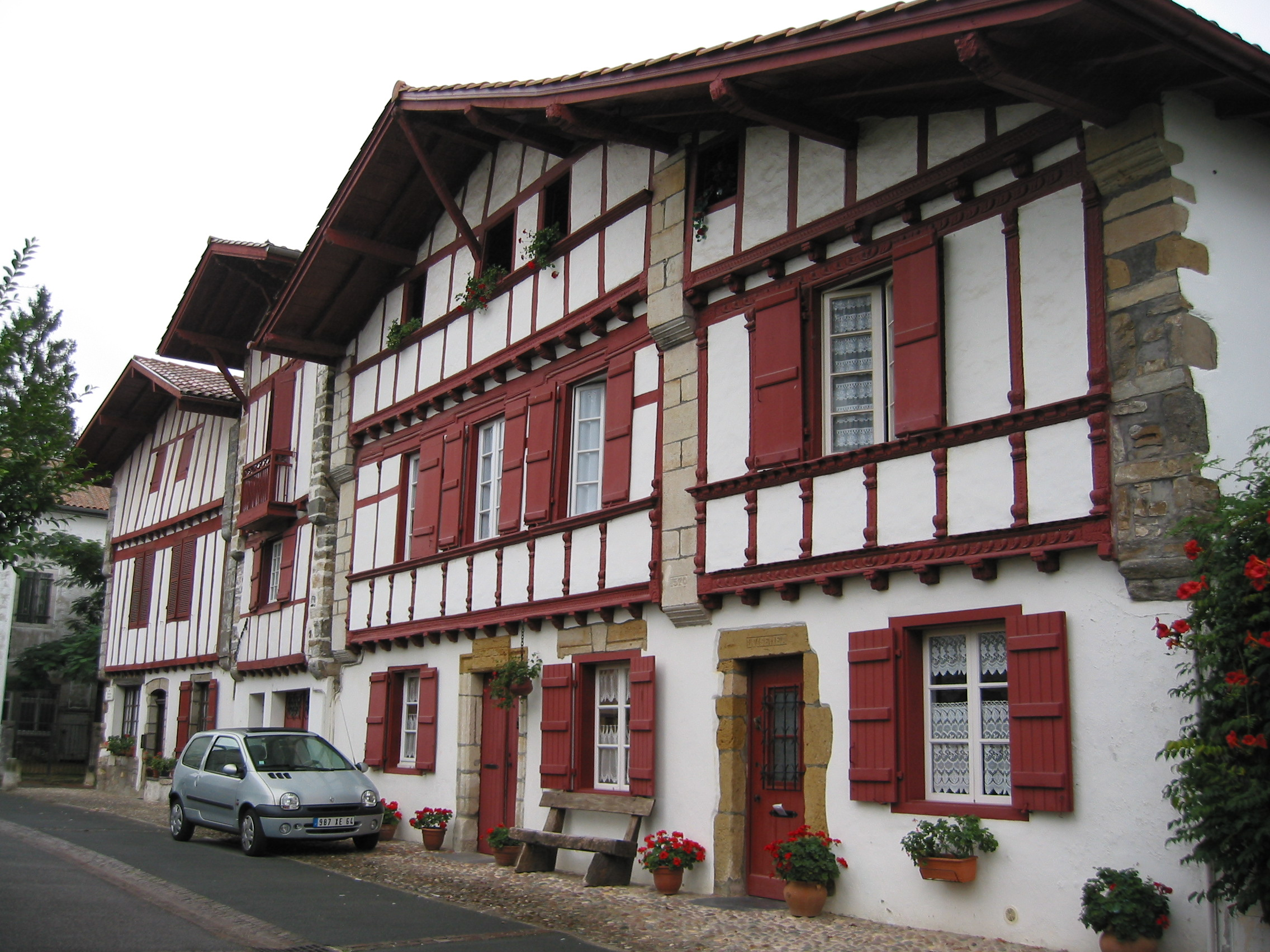
A Basque etxea in Uztaritze

Basque surnames are surnames with Basque-language origins or a long, identifiable tradition in the Basque Country. They can be divided into two main types, patronymic and non-patronymic.

The patronymics such as Aluariz (probably Alvariz, child of Alvar, as in the past 'u' and 'v' were indistinguishable in writing), Obecoz or Garcez are amongst the most ancient, going as far back as the 10th century. The Basque monarchy, including the first king of Pamplona, Íñigo Arista of Pamplona, or Eneko Aritza, were the first to use this type of surname. Patronymics are by far the most common surnames in the whole of the Basque Autonomous Community and Navarre.

The non-patronymic surnames are often toponymic ones that refer to the family's etxea, the historically all important family home. When a farm (baserri) was rented to another family, often the new tenants were known locally by the farm name rather than by their officially registered surname. They also referred to the occupation of the head of the family such as Olaberria ("the new forge") or Salaberria (new farm/farmer) or could describe where their home was such as Elizondo ("by the church"). An example of a common Basque surname is Azpilicueta.

== History ==
=== Oldest records ===
The earliest documented Basque surnames occur on Aquitanian inscriptions from the time of the Roman conquest of Hispania and Gallia Aquitania. For the most part these can be easily identified with modern or medieval Basque surnames, for example ENNECONIS (the personal name Eneko plus the Latin genitive ending -IS, stem augmented by -N) > Enekoitz.

Also SEMBECONNIS, possibly a derivative of the later surname Jimenez (Scemeno attested in the 8–9th century). V(alerius) BELTESONIS (probable coinage from beltz 'black', less likely linked to bele/bela 'crow') engraved on the stella of Andriarriaga located in Oiartzun bears witness to a mixture of Roman and Vasconic tradition in the local aristocracy during the Antiquity.

=== Medieval names ===
García, one of the most frequent Spanish surnames, was originally a Basque first name stemming from Basque gartzea, 'the young'. Medieval Basque names follow this descriptive naming pattern about the person, pointing to physical features ("Gutia", "Motza", "Okerra", "Ezkerro", "Zuria", etc.), family relations or geographical origin, e.g. Eneko (Spanish Íñigo) may be a hypocoristic mother-to-child addressing, 'my little'.

In the Middle Ages, a totemic animal figure often stood for the person's presumable features. Otxoa ("wolf") was a Basque version of the Romance name Lope, or the other way round, with an early medieval prevalence all around the Pyrenees and west into the Cantabrian Mountains. It is now a surname, like its akin "Otxotorena" ('little wolf's house', or possibly 'little wolf's wife'), so similar in meaning to Spanish "López" (regional variants "Lopes", "Lupiz", etc.). "Velasco" was a name, later to become a surname, derived from Basque "belasko", 'small raven'. "Aznar" is a medieval Basque, Gascon and Spanish surname arguably based on old Basque "azenari", 'fox' (modern Basque "azeri", cf. old Basque "Zenarrutza" vs. modern Basque "Ziortza").

The non-patronymic, descriptive Basque naming tradition came to a halt when in the 16th century Catholic Church tightened regulations to Christianize practices that didn't stick to the Church's orthodoxy (cf. given name Ochanda, 'female wolf', in Vitoria-Gasteiz still in the 16th century). Thereafter, Romance first names were imposed, while surnames went on to express place descriptions (e.g. "Luzuriaga", 'place of white earth') and parental origin (e.g. "Marinelarena", 'the sailor's son') for the most part. The patronymics are derived from the father through the suffix -ez, -oz, -iz or -az which means 'of'. The Basque language also expresses family links with the genitive suffix -(r)ena, e.g. Perurena, Arozena, etc., meaning 'belonging to'.

=== Upper nobility ===
The first king of Navarre, Íñigo Arista of Pamplona, is said to hail from the lineage of Iñigo (Eneko). While the use of -ez was the norm amongst the monarchs of Pamplona and the Lords of Biscay, the first record we have of the use of -ez in the monarchs of Leon is through the consort queens from Navarre: Jimena of Asturias^{[es]}, Oneca of Pamplona^{[es]} or Urraca Fernández.

Marital alliances between the Christian kingdoms of Leon and Navarre were typical in the 9th, 10th and 11th centuries in order to protect themselves from the southern Islamic attacks. Proof is the fact that King Alfonso V of León was mainly of Basque-Navarrese origin, through his mother, Elvira García, and his paternal grandmother, the aforementioned Urraca Fernández.

On the other hand, the first king of Aragón, Ramiro I of Aragon, was son of Sancho III of Navarre, grandson of García Sánchez II of Pamplona, and great-grandson of Sancho Garcés II of Pamplona, all of them kings of Navarre who used the suffix -ez and that could have introduced it in this region.

As a result of the Reconquista, the Douro basin was repopulated, most probably by people mainly coming from Navarre, Biscay, Cantabria or Alava, who used the suffix -ez. Furthermore, it is possible that many of the most common patronymic Spanish surnames are not only of Basque-Navarrese origin, but also of royal and aristocratic background. It is logical to assume that the royal families from Leon, Navarre, Aragón and the aristocracy of Biscay, Alava or La Rioja would have had larger numbers of offspring than the regular population given their greater financial means and longer life expectancy.

== Grammar and orthography ==
The grammar of the patronymic endings -ez, -iz or -oz is very similar to that of their use to denote origin or content such as egurrez (made of wood), harriz (made of stone) or ardoz bete (full of wine). In Basque, -z is added to the end of the word if it ends in vowel (as in Muñoz, offspring of Munio) or -ez if the word ends in consonant (as in Antúnez, offspring of Anton). This grammar structure is not always the case in the patronymic surnames, e.g., González, offspring of Gonzalo. However, in documents of the 10th, 11th and 12th century linked to the Monastery of Santa Maria de Nájera, we find old versions of these surnames such as Galindoz, Enecoz, Albaroz, Ordonioz, Munioz de Alava, and Lopiz de Bizcaya. It is possible that the proper Basque grammar of the patronymic was lost as its use was extended south of the Basque country.

During the medieval period Basque names were written broadly following the spelling conventions of the official languages of the day, usually Spanish and French. The main differences lie in the way the relatively large number of Basque sibilants are spelled. These are especially hard to represent using French spelling conventions, so on the whole, the French spelling of Basque words in general tends to be harder to reconcile with the modern spellings and the pronunciation. Also, vowel-initial Basque surnames from the Northern Basque Country acquired an initial d (French de) in many cases, often obscuring the original Basque form e.g. Duhalt < de + uhalte ('the stream environs'), Dotchandabarats < de + otxandabaratz ('orchard of the female wolf'), Delouart < del + uharte ('between streams').

Since the introduction of Standard Basque and a common written standard, the number of non-indigenous spelling variants has begun to decrease, especially in Spain, taking on a form in accordance with the meaning of the surname in Basque, which remains irrelevant in other language spellings. The Basque Language Academy keeps a database with the standardized form of personal names.

Modern Standard	Spanish Spelling	French Spelling
Aroztegi	Arostegui	Rosteguy
Elizalde	Elizalde	Elissalde/Delissalde/Delissalt
Eneko	Iñigo/Yñigo	Éneco/Ínego/
Etxeberria	Echeverría	Etcheverry/Detcheverry/Echeverri
Etxepare	Echepare	Etchepare/Detchepare
Ezkibel	Esquivel	Esquibel
Intxausti	Inchausti	Ynchausty
Zubiri	Zubiri	Çubiry

Note that in the French-based spellings the D is unhistoric and represents the French partitive particle d' "of".

== Conventions ==
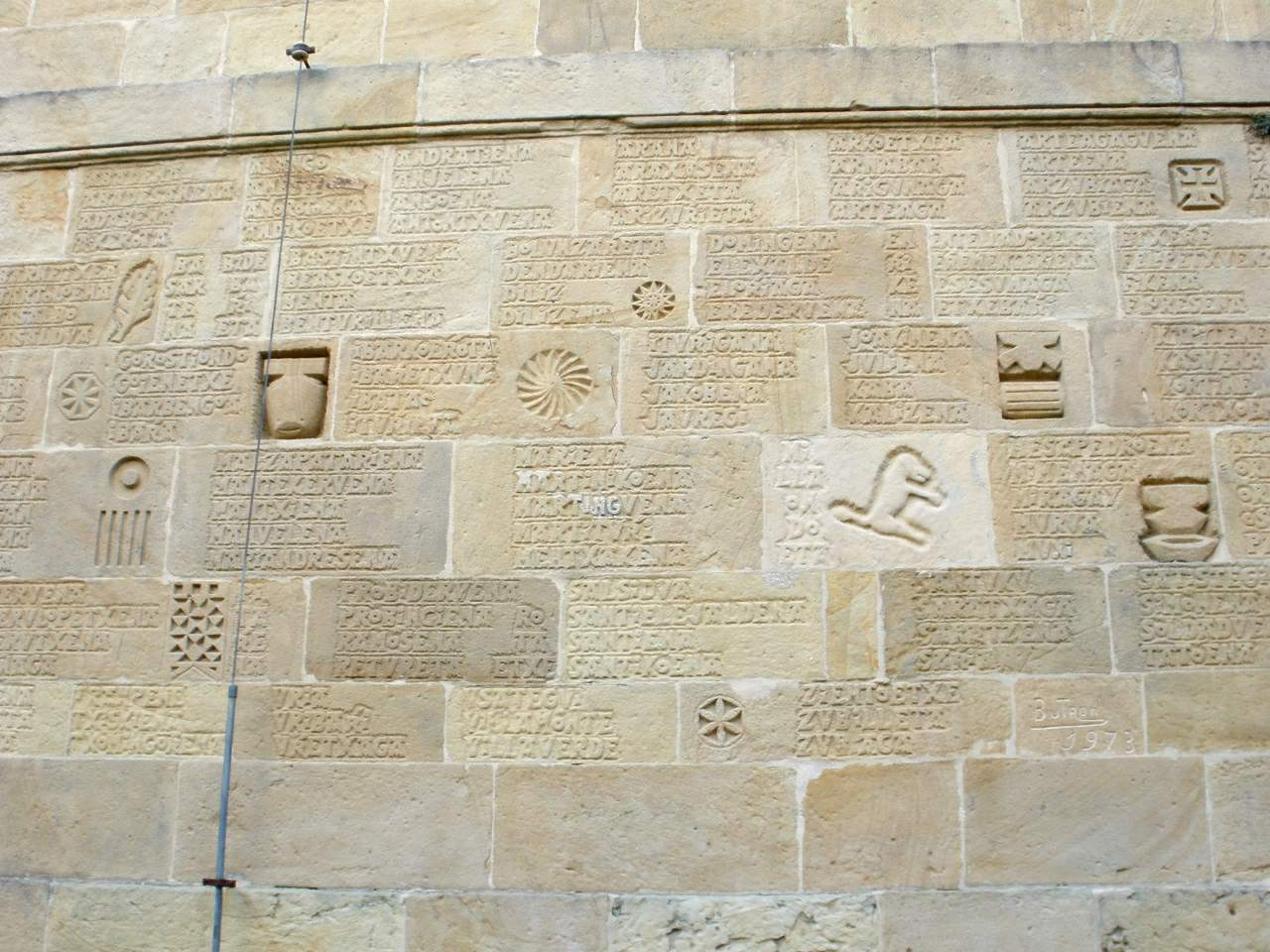
Relief with the names of the farmhouses of Getxo, on the wall of Saint Mary's church.

As is the legal convention in Spain, Basques in the South have double legal surnames, the first being that of the father and the second that of the mother. In the North, Basques legally have only one surname as is the convention in France. Nonetheless, most Basques can at least recite the surnames of their parents' and grandparents' generations. The founder of Basque nationalism, Sabino Arana, demanded a certain quantity of Basque surnames from his followers in order to reject those of mixed Basque-Spanish descent.

In Alava and west of Navarre a distinctive formula has been followed, with the surname being composite, i.e. [a first title of Castilian origin; usually a patronymic which uses the Basque suffix -ez] + de + [a Basque place-name (usually a village)], take for instance Fernández de Larrinoa, Ruiz de Gauna or López de Luzuriaga, meaning 'Fernández from Larrinoa', etc., which does not imply a noble origin. Therefore, surnames can be very long if both paternal and maternal surnames are required when filling out a form for example. Such forms have been found from as early as 1053.

For a while it was popular in some circles to follow a convention of stating one's name that was invented by Sabino Arana in the latter part of the 19th century. He decided that Basque surnames ought to be followed by the suffix -(t)ar. Thus he adopted the habit of giving his name, Sabino Arana Goiri, as Arana ta Goiri'taŕ Sabin. This style was adopted for a while by a number of his fellow Basque Nationalist Party (PNV/EAJ) supporters but has largely fallen out of fashion now.

These descriptive surnames can become very long. The family will probably be known by a short form or a nickname. The longest Basque surname recorded is Burionagonatotorecagageazcoechea sported by an employee at the Ministry of Finances in Madrid in 1867.

== Types and composition ==
The majority of modern Basque non-patronymic surnames fall into two categories:

- a descriptive of the family house. This usually either refers to the relative location of the home or the purpose of the building.
- the first owner of the house. Usually this is a man's name. These surnames are relatively recent

Surnames from either category are formed using nouns, adjectives, a number of suffixes and endings such as the absolutive ending -a, the adjectival suffix -ko, and the genitive ending -ren. An example of the second class are Martinikorena ("Martinico's [house]", Martinico being a Navarrese hypocorism for Martin). Another would be Mikelena, "Michael's".

The following examples all relate to the location of the family home.

Surname	Elements	Meaning
Arrigorriagakoa	(h)arri "stone" + gorri "red" + aga "place of" + -ko "of" + -a "the"	the one of the place of the red stones
Aroztegi	(h)arotz "smith/carpenter" + -tegi "place"	smith's workshop/carpentry
Bidarte	bide "way" + arte "between"	between the ways
Bolibar	bolu "mill" + ibar "valley"	mill valley
Elkano	elke "vegetable garden" + no "small"	small vegetable garden
Elizondo	eliza "church" + ondo "nearby"	near the church
Etxandi	etxe "house" + handi "big"	big house
Etxarte	etxe "house" + arte "between"	house between
Etxeberri	etxe "house" + berri "new"	new house
Goikoetxea	goi "high place" + etxe "house" + -a "the"	the high lying house
Ibaiguren	ibai "river" + guren "edge"	river's edge
Ibarra	ibar "valley" + -a "the"	the valley
Lardizabal	lar "bramble patch" + zabal "wide"	wide bramble patch
Lekubarri	lekhu "place" + barri "new"	new place
Loiola	lohi "mud" + -ola "place"	muddy place
Mariñelarena	Marinela "sailor" + suffix "rena"	the sailor's (home/son)
Mendiluze	mendi "mountain" + luze "long"	the long mountain
Mendoza	mendi "mountain" + hotza "cold"	cold mountain
Urberoaga	ur "water" + bero "hot" + -aga "place of"	the place of the hot water
Zabala	zabal "wide" + -a "the"	the wide one
Zubiondo	zubi "bridge" + ondo "nearby"	near the bridge
Yñigo (Eneko)	ene- "mine", -ko (hypocristic)	my little (love/dear)

== Recognizing Basque non-patronymic surnames ==
Basque non patronymic surnames are relatively easy to spot through the high frequency of certain elements and endings used in their formation, bearing in mind the spelling variants. Outside the Basque Country, Basque surnames are often found in Spain and France, the former Spanish colonies, but largely in Latin America, and parts of the United States such as Idaho where substantial numbers of Basques emigrated to.

Modern Spelling	Meaning	Older Spellings
-aga	place of	
agirre	prominence	aguirre
-alde	side	alde
-arte	between	art
aurre(a)	front	
barren(a)	inner, lowest. Often in a pair with goien	
behe	down	be, ve
berri(a), barri(a)	new	berry, varri, verría, verry
bide(a)	way, path	vida, vide
buru	head, end	bure
garai(a)	high/raised granary	garay
goi	high	goy
eliza	church	eliç(e), elic(e), eliss, elex, elej
-eta	abundance of	ette
etxe(a)	house	ech, eche, etche
gorri(a)	red	corri, gourry
(h)aritz(a)	oak	áriz, harits
(h)arri(a)	stone	harri, harry
iri, uri	populated place, nearby	
iturri	source	
mendi(a)	mountain	mendy
neko	eneko	arquiñigo, erquiñigo, iñigo, necochea, yñigo
-ola	hut, forge	olha
-ondo	nearby	onde
sagar(ra)	apple	
-tegi	home, workshop	tegui
-(t)za	abundance	
urru(ti)	far, beyond	
zabal(a)	wide, meadow	çabal, zábal, zaval
-zahar(ra)	old	zar, zaar
zubi	bridge	subi

== See also ==
- Legal name
- Patronymic
- Personal name
- Surname map
- Ocho apellidos vascos

=== Significant Basque surnames ===
These are Basque surnames that are well known or famous around the world (and their Spanish form, when it differs):

- Agirre / Sp: Aguirre
- Allende (possibly)
- Altzibar / Sp: Alcívar
- Alkorta / Sp: Alcorta (or Algorta)
- Altube
- Amenábar
- Ametzaga / Sp: Amézaga
- Ameztoy / Sp: Amestoy
- Anzoátegui
- Apodaka / Sp: Apodaca
- Araia / Sp: Araya
- Arana
- Aramburu
- Arauz
- Aristarain
- Aristizábal
- Armendaritz / Sp: Armendáriz
- Aroztegi / Sp: Aróstegui
- Arrate
- Arredondo
- Arrieta
- Arteaga
- Ayala
- Azkarraga / Sp: Azcárraga
- Baroja
- Bedoya
- Bengoetxea / Sp: Bengoechea
- Bergara / Sp: Vergara
- Berazategi (or Berazategui) / Sp: Berasategui
- Berriotxoa / Sp: Berriochoa
- Biskarret / Sp: Viscarrat
- Bizkarra / Sp: Vizcarra
- Bolívar
- Boluarte
- Bordaberry
- Cenarruza
- Deredia / Sp: Heredia
- Duhalde
- Elizabelar
- Elizalde
- Elizondo
- Elorriaga
- Errázuriz
- Eskibel / Sp: Esquível
- Etxandi / Sp: Echandi
- Etxebarren / Sp: Echebarren
- Etxeberria (or Etxebarria, Etxeberri, Etxebarri) / Sp: Echeverría (or Echevarría, Echeverry, Echevarri)
- Etxegarai / Sp: Echegaray
- Etxegoien / Sp: Echegoyen
- Etxemendi / Sp: Echemendi
- Etxenike / Sp: Echenique
- Estigabirria
- Ezkurra / Sp: Ezcurra
- Funes
- Gabiria / Sp: Gaviria
- Galartza / Sp: Galarza
- Gaona
- Garai / Sp: Garay
- Garaikoetxea / Sp: Garaicoechea
- Garamendi
- Gartzia, Gartzea or Gaztea / Sp: García, Garcíaz, Garcíez, Garcez
- Gebara / Sp: Guevara
- Goikoetxea / Sp: Goicoechea
- Goizueta
- Ibarra / Sp: Ybarra/Ibarra
- Ibarruri
- Indurain
- Intxaurrondo / Sp: Inchaurrondo
- Iriarte
- Iriondo
- Irigoien / Sp: Irigoyen/Yrigoyen
- Iturbi
- Iturbide
- Izagirre / Sp: Izaguirre
- Jauregi / Sp: Jáuregui
- Karrantza / Sp: Carranza
- Kortazar / Sp Cortázar
- Lardizabal
- Larrain
- Larrañaga
- Larrazabal
- Laxalt
- Legazpi
- Loiola / Sp: Loyola
- Madariaga
- Maeztu / Sp: Maestu
- Mariñelarena
- Mendieta
- Mendizabal
- Mendoza
- Mitxelena / Sp: Michelena
- Montoia / Sp: Montoya
- Muxika / Sp: Mújica
- Nabarro / Fr: Navarre, Sp: Navarro
- Oiarzabal / Sp: Oyarzábal
- Okendo / Sp: Oquendo
- Ormazabal / Sp: Ormazábal, Hormazábal
- Orozko / Sp: Orozco
- Ortiz
- Orzabal
- Otxoa / Sp: Ochoa
- Oyarzábal
- Sagasta
- Sagasti
- Salazar
- Semen / Sp: Jiménez
- Telletxea / Sp: Tellechea
- Ugartetxe / Sp: Ugarteche
- Uharte / Sp: Ugarte or Huarte
- Unamuno
- Untzaga / Sp: Unzaga
- Urdaneta
- Uriarte
- Uribe
- Uriburu
- Urrutia
- Urkiza / Sp: Urquiza
- Uzain
- Yaben
- Ybarra / Sp: Ibarra
- Zabala / Sp: Zavala
- Zabaleta / Sp: Zavaleta
- Zaldibar / Sp: Zaldívar, Saldívar
- Zárate
- Zatarain (or Katarain)
- Zelaia / Sp: Celaya or Zelaya (surname), and Celaá
- Zorreguieta
- Zubillaga
- Zubiria (or Zufiria)
- Zuloaga (or Zuluaga)
- Zuñiga
