= Mendizabal =

Mendizabal or Mendizábal is a Basque surname meaning 'wide mountain'. It may refer to:

- Concepción Mendizábal Mendoza (1893–1985), first female civil engineer in Mexico
- Enrique Mendizabal (1918–2017), Olympic Shooter for Peru at the 1948 London Games
- Eustakio Mendizabal (1944–1973), Basque separatist
- Félix Mendizábal (1891–1959), Spanish athlete
- Gabriel de Mendizabal Iraeta (1765–1838), general during the Napoleonic Wars
- Guillermo Mendizábal (born 1954), retired Mexican footballer and manager
- Horacio Mendizábal (1847–1871), Argentinian poet
- Itziar Mendizabal (born 1981), ballet dancer
- José María Álvarez Mendizábal (1891–1965), Spanish politician and lawyer
- Joxe Mendizabal (born 1970), Basque musician
- Juan Álvarez Mendizábal (1790–1853), Spanish economist and politician
- Luis A. Aranberri Mendizabal "Amatiño" (born 1945), Basque media professional
- Mamen Mendizábal (born 1976), Spanish television and radio journalist
- Mariano Juaristi Mendizábal (1904–2001), Azkoitian Basque pelota player known as Atano III
- Rafael de Mendizábal Allende (1927–2023), Spanish judge
- Ramón de Mendizábal (1914–1938), Spanish footballer
- Ricky Mendizábal (born 1997), Spanish-Equatoguinean basketball player
- Rosendo Mendizabal (1868–1913), Argentine musician and early pioneer of the tango.
- Sergio Mendizábal (1920–2005), Spanish actor

== See also ==
- Ecclesiastical Confiscations of Mendizábal also known as the Desamortizacion Ecclesiastica de Mendizabal encompasses a set of decrees from 1835 to 1837 that resulted in the expropriation, and privatization, of monastic properties in Spain
