= Saldívar =

Saldívar or Saldivar is a Spanish surname of Basque origins. Notable people with the surname include:

- Efren Saldivar
- Juan Augusto Saldívar
- John Saldivar (fashion designer)
- John Saldivar (politician)
- Vicente Saldivar
- Yolanda Saldívar

== See also ==
- Zaldívar
