= José Agustín de Lecubarri =

British diplomat, naval officer and peer

José Agustín de Lecubarri y Gorostiza, KB (25 June 1802 – 6 January 1874), was a Spanish diplomat and naval officer. His significant diplomatic achievements during the First Carlist War earned him the Grand Cross of the Order of Isabella the Catholic, as well as the Order of Charles III.

== Early years ==
Lecubarri was born in London into an old Spanish hidalgo lineage, son of Hussar cavalry officer Manuel de Lecubarri y Uraga and Manuela Gorostiza y Egusqueaguirre. He returned to Spain briefly following his birth to be baptised through the Catholic Church 2 August 1802, at the Church of Saint Vincent near Bilbao.

His military career began on 4 September 1824 as Midshipman, rising to Frigate Ensign in June 1825 aboard the frigate Aretusa, thereafter promoted to captain of said frigate in January 1828. Such actions as captain earned him the Cross to Naval Merit.

== Diplomatic career ==
In 1833, he left the Navy to devote himself to diplomacy. Back in London he joins as Consul General of Spain to the United Kingdom, being the youngest in history to hold such office. Lecubarri and the ambassador, Juan Nepomuceno Vial, managed to consolidate an exceptional relationship with mutually supportive policies, which would serve as a breeding ground for the sending of troops by the British Government in the First Carlist War. The British Auxiliary Legion became a determining factor in the course of the war.

On 30 July 1835 the first battalion of the British Auxiliary Legion arrived in Santander, with the rest of the troops arriving throughout the summer. 1000 soldiers received shelter in the city, while another 4000 settled in the Monastery of Monte Corbán At the end of the summer of 1836, a number close to 10,000 men of the unit were concentrated in the outskirts of San Sebastián led by George De Lacy Evans who in turn was under the command of the General Luis Fernández de Córdova.

His services to the crown during the beginning of the First Carlist War earned him the cross of the Order of Charles III. Subsequently, and as a reward for his encouragement of favourable relations and cooperation between Spain and his country of birth, the queen Isabela II imposed him the Grand Cross of the Order of Isabella the Catholic in 1847.

Despite his allegiance to Queen Isabella, José Agustín de Lecubarri confessed his inclination towards the old order several times, praising the war achievements of the Infante Carlos María Isidro on numerous occasions.

He died on 6 January 1874 in Bilbao, Spain.

== Honours ==
=== National ===
- (Restoration (Spain)) House of Bourbon: Knight Cross of the Order of Charles III (1834)
- (Restoration (Spain)) House of Bourbon: White Cross of Naval Merit (1829)

=== Foreign ===
- (United Kingdom of Great Britain and Ireland) House of Hanover: Knight Companion of the Most Honourable Order of the Bath (1836)

== See also ==
- Spain-United Kingdom relations
- Carlist Wars
