= Iborra =

Iborra is a surname. Notable people with the surname include:

- Monique Iborra (born 1945), French politician
- José Iborra Blanco (1908–2002), Spanish footballer
- Vicente Iborra (born 1988), Spanish footballer

== See also ==
- Ibarra (surname)
