= John Saldivar =

John Saldivar may refer to:

- John Saldivar (fashion designer)
- John Saldivar (politician)
