= Bedoya =

Bedoya may refer to:

- Bedhaya, also rendered as Bedoya, an Indonesian sacred dance
- Bedoya (surname), including a list of people with the name
