= Zelaya =

Zelaya may refer to:

- Celaya, a city in Mexico
- Zelaya Department, a former department of Nicaragua
- Zelaya, Buenos Aires, a settlement in Pilar Partido in Argentina
- Zelaya (surname)
