= Bedoya (surname) =

Bedoya is a common surname in Spanish-speaking countries. Notable people with the surname include:

== Arts and entertainment ==
- Alfonso Bedoya (1904–1957), Mexican actor, frequently in U.S. films
- Lucía Bedoya, Colombian actress and model
- Miguel Harth-Bedoya (born 1968), Peruvian conductor

== Politics and government ==
- Alvaro Bedoya (born 1982), American privacy advocate and Federal Trade Commission (FTC) nominee
- Carlos García-Bedoya (1925–1980), Peruvian diplomat
- Felipe Francisco Molina y Bedoya, Chancellor of the Federal Republic of Central America
- Harold Bedoya Pizarro (1938–2017), former General and Commander of the Colombian National Army
- Hernán Bedoya (died 2017), Colombian land rights activist
- Javier Bedoya (born 1948), Peruvian politician and former Congressman from Lima (2006–2011 term)
- Jineth Bedoya Lima (born c. 1974), Colombian journalist and advocate
- José Díaz de Bedoya, member in Paraguayan Triumvirate following death of Francisco Solano López from November to December 1870
- José Manuel García Bedoya, Peruvian politician in the early 1930s
- Luis Bedoya Reyes (1919–2021), Peruvian Christian Democrat politician in the late 1960s
- María Dolores Bedoya (1783–1853), Guatemalan independence activist

== Sports ==
- Andrés Bedoya (1928–1961), Peruvian footballer
- Alejandro Bedoya (born 1987), American soccer player
- Gerardo Bedoya (born 1975), Colombian footballer
- Jorge Bedoya (1929–2001), Argentinian equestrian
- John Jairo Bedoya Jr., known professionally as "Xavier" (1977–2020), American wrestler
- Miguel Bedoya (born 1986), Spanish footballer
- Yhonatan Bedoya (born 1996), Colombian footballer

Media related to Bedoya (surname) at Wikimedia Commons
