= Iturbide =

Iturbide may refer to:

- Iturbide (surname)
- House of Iturbide, imperial house of Mexico
  - Agustín de Iturbide
- Iturbide, Nuevo León
- Iturbide Bridge, a locale of the Tampico Affair
- Villa de Hidalgo, San Luis Potosí
