= Ibarra =

Ibarra (which means alluvial plain in Basque) may refer to:

== Places ==
- Ibarra Canton, Ecuador
  - Ibarra, Ecuador, the capital of Imbabura Province and the canton
    - Roman Catholic Diocese of Ibarra, inside the city
- Ibarra, Spain, a municipality in Gipuzkoa
- Ibarra Peak, Victoria Land, Antarctica
- Ibarra, Villa Clara, located in the ward of Vega Alta, Villa Clara Province, Cuba

== Other uses ==
- Ibarra (surname)
- Ibarra (chocolate), a brand of Mexican-style chocolate
- Ibarra (horse), a racehorse
- UD Ibarra, a Spanish football team based in Arona, Tenerife
- Juan Crisóstomo Ibarra y Magsalin, commonly referred as "Ibarra" or "Crisóstomo", the protagonist of the Philippine novel Noli Me Tángere by José Rizal

== See also ==
- Ybarra, a surname
