= Argentine CREA Movement (AACREA) =

Argentine non-profit organisation

Argentine Association of Regional Consortiums for Agricultural Experimentation
- Asociación Argentina de Consorcios Regionales de Experimentación Agrícola
- Abbreviation: AACREA
- Founded: 3 March 1960
- Founder: Pablo Hary
- Type: Civil association
- Headquarters: Sarmiento 1236, Buenos Aires, Argentina
- Location: Argentina
- Members: ~2,000 agricultural enterprises
- President: Fernando de Nevares (2025–2027)
- Award: Konex Awards — Special Mention (1998)
- Website: crea.org.ar

The Argentine Association of Regional Consortiums for Agricultural Experimentation (AACREA; Spanish: Asociación Argentina de Consorcios Regionales de Experimentación Agrícola), also known as the CREA Movement, is an Argentine non-profit civil association that brings together agricultural entrepreneurs organized in collaborative peer groups called CREA Groups. It was formally established on 3 March 1960, although the movement originated in March 1957 with the creation of the first group in the towns of Henderson and Daireaux, Buenos Aires Province.

The association is based on a methodology of regional groups made up of ten to twelve agricultural entrepreneurs who share technical, economic and management experience under the coordination of a hired technical adviser, in monthly rotating meetings held at members' establishments. By 2025 AACREA gathered approximately 2,000 agricultural enterprises distributed in around 200 groups organized in 18 productive regions of Argentina, with a total network estimated at 28,240 people including entrepreneurs, advisers, technicians and collaborators.

In 1998 AACREA received a Special Mention in the Konex Awards, Institutions - Community - Enterprise category, at a ceremony held at the Teatro Colón in Buenos Aires on 18 November of that year. In recent years the association has developed an extensive digital infrastructure, including the agricultural benchmarking platform DAT (Datos Agrícolas Trazados, Traced Agricultural Data), launched in 2018, and has been the subject of academic analysis as a key actor in the transformation of the Argentine agricultural model.

== History ==
=== Origin (1957) ===
The movement originates in the methodology of the French Centre d'études techniques agricoles (CETA), farmer groups that formed in France in the immediate aftermath of the Second World War to promote technical exchange among producers. In 1955 the Argentine Pablo Hary (1901–1995), a trained architect and an agricultural engineer honoris causa, came into contact with this methodology through the Frenchman Capelle.

In March 1957, Hary initiated the first agricultural experimentation group in the area of Henderson and Daireaux, in western Buenos Aires Province. The group consisted of farmers who shared their technical and economic experience each month in rotating meetings held at members' establishments.

=== Formal foundation of AACREA (1960) ===
On 3 March 1960 the formal foundation of the Argentine Association of Regional Consortiums for Agricultural Experimentation (AACREA) was established, consolidating the federated structure of the groups that had emerged since 1957. Pablo Hary was its first president.

=== Consolidation and expansion (1970s–1990s) ===
In the following decades the movement expanded to different productive areas of the country, forming autonomous regions within the federated structure. In academic historiography, AACREA has been characterised as one of the main "technical entities" of Argentine agriculture and a key actor in the introduction and diffusion of technological innovations during what has been described as the "technological revolution" of the Argentine countryside.

In 1993 AACREA became a member of the Board of Directors of the ArgenINTA Foundation, alongside the National Institute of Agricultural Technology (INTA), the Argentine Rural Confederations, the Argentine Agrarian Federation and the Argentine Rural Society. In 1998 it received the Konex Special Mention.

=== Internationalisation ===
The CREA model was replicated in Uruguay, where in 1966 FUCREA (Uruguayan Federation of CREA Groups) was founded on the basis of four preexisting groups that adopted the Argentine methodology. A similar scheme operates in Paraguay as CREA PY.

=== Digital transformation (2010–present) ===
From the second decade of the 21st century, AACREA developed a significant digital infrastructure. This process has been the subject of academic analysis for its impact on the associative dynamics of Argentine agriculture.

In 2018 the DAT (Datos Agrícolas Trazados) platform was launched as a collaborative database of agronomic indicators contributed by members. In parallel, the organization consolidated its editorial presence (Revista CREA magazine, Contenidos CREA web portal), audiovisual (YouTube channel, podcast "Empresas que Inspiran" co-produced with Banco Galicia) and training presence (Formación CREA platform and CaD CREA virtual campus).

== Organisational structure ==
=== Levels ===
The organization operates with a federated structure at four levels:

1. Group — basic unit of 10–12 enterprises.
2. Zone — grouping of several geographically close groups.
3. Region — grouping of zones under a regional coordinator.
4. National AACREA — the federating association based in Buenos Aires.

=== Regions ===
By 2026 AACREA was organized in approximately 18 productive regions, each covering a specific agroecological area of the country. Some institutional sources after the 2025 CREA Congress mention 19 regions, as a result of recent restructurings.

== Programmes and research ==
=== DAT (Traced Agricultural Data) ===
DAT is a collaborative digital platform launched in 2018 that consolidates agricultural management variables contributed by CREA enterprises. The system enables regional benchmarking analysis, identification of successful practices and correlation studies between management and production outcomes.

=== Training ===
The association manages training programmes through the Formación CREA and CaD CREA virtual campus platforms, as well as the CREA AgTech programme in partnership with the Universidad de San Andrés.

=== Publications ===
AACREA publishes Revista CREA, a monthly technical magazine, as well as the Quarterly Economic Report prepared by its team of economists. The Contenidos CREA portal operates as a digital editorial platform with frequent publication of technical articles.

=== National Congress ===
Every four years the organization holds the CREA National Congress. The 2025 edition, held on 18 and 19 September at Tecnópolis, drew approximately 8,000 participants, with 83 sponsors and 100 talks delivered by over 90 speakers.

== Impact and public positioning ==
=== Awards ===
In 1998 AACREA received the Special Mention of the Konex Awards in the Institutions - Community - Enterprise category.

=== Institutional positions ===
As a representative body of the agricultural sector, AACREA has expressed public positions on policies affecting the sector. In June 2025, its president Fernando de Nevares declared that "the federal development Argentina needs is conditioned by export duties" (DEX).

=== Academic coverage ===
The CREA Movement has been analysed in Argentine agrarian historiography, including studies on its political and corporate intervention between 1957 and 1976, its role in the transition toward the agribusiness model, its digital transformations and associative dynamics, and the ideological construction of its discourse as a technical entity. Osvaldo Barsky and Mabel Dávila (2008) analysed AACREA's role during the 2008 conflict over mobile export duties.

== See also ==
- National Institute of Agricultural Technology (INTA)
- Agriculture in Argentina
