= Apostolici Ministerii =

Apostolici Ministerii was a papal bull issued 23 May 1724, by Pope Innocent XIII, for the revival of ecclesiastical discipline in Spain. The Primate and Philip V of Spain had reported to the Pope that the disciplinary laws of the Council of Trent were gradually falling into disuse. The Pope submitted the matter to the Sacred Congregation of the Council, and with its advice issued the above-mentioned Bull.

== Contents ==
It lays down rules for the secular and for the regular clergy of Spain, of which the following are the leading points:

- Tonsure is in no case to be conferred unless to meet the demands of religion, and in each case the cleric must be assigned to some church.
- Seminarists, lest their studies be interfered with, are to attend the Cathedral on festival days only.
- All candidates for holy orders must undergo an examination and show adequate knowledge.
- The benefice or the title for which one is ordained must be sufficient for his decent support, and benefices of uncertain revenue are to be suppressed.
- Those who have the cure of souls must regularly instruct the faithful under their care, and in any cases where through past laxity of discipline they are not fit to do it themselves, must at their own expense have it done by others who are capable.
- Parishes which are so extensive that the parishioners cannot regularly attend Mass are to be divided, according to the discretion of the bishop, irrespective of the will of the parish priest; or at least, a second church must be built for their convenience within the parish.
- In view of evils which have arisen, the number of persons who receive the habit in religious orders must never be greater than the revenues of the community are capable of supporting.
- It shall belong to the exclusive competence of the bishops to provide ordinary and extraordinary confessors for nuns.
- Bishops are to see that the ritual and rubrics are carefully observed. They must also correct such abuses as have crept in with regard to the clergy, secular or regular, celebrating Mass in private oratories, in the cells of monasteries, or on portable altars; they must not themselves celebrate Mass in any private chapel except in the chapel of the episcopal residence.

Rules are furthermore laid down in the Bull, according to which they are to conduct both criminal and civil causes.

== Impact ==
The Bull's ecclesiastical reforms took effect both in Spain and in its foreign colonies. Cyril of Barcelona was sent to New Orleans to implement its provisions.
