= Cry of Alcorta =

Agrarian uprising in Argentina

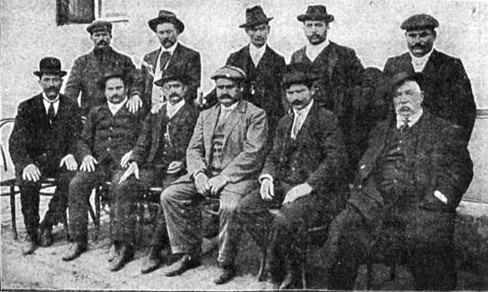
- Date: June 25 – August 15, 1912
- Location: Argentina (Santa Fe Province and the Pampas)
- Type: conflict
- Outcome: Creation of the FAA

The Cry of Alcorta (Spanish: Grito de Alcorta) was an agrarian rebellion that took place in 1912 in Alcorta, Argentina. The rebels were primarily immigrants from Spain or from Italy. It began at the south of the Santa Fe Province, with requests of better working conditions and better contracts. Contracts were poor, due to land having already been claimed and staked out after the Conquest of the Desert, leaving workers with no other choice than to accept contracts not as prosperous as would be liked. Ideologically, the protesters bore no similarity to the contemporary anarchists. The protest achieved the desired goals, and the Federación Agraria Argentina was established on August 15.

== Revolt ==
Protests began when a rally of 2,000 Italians under the Sociedad Italiana de Alcorta (English: Italian Society of Alcorta) gathered on June 25. They refused to harvest crops until their demands were met. From there, the strike spread to Buenos Aires, Córdoba, Entre Ríos. Although the workers were discontent with the leasing system, they did not request the complete eradication of the system, only better terms. The few workers that proposed a radical goal did not prevail. On August 15, the protestors had their demands met and the Federación Agraria Argentina was founded to protect farmers.
