= Zubiria =

Zubiria is a surname. Notable people with the surname include:

- Alberto Fermín Zubiría(1901–1971), President of Uruguay
- Amaia Zubiria (born 1947), Spanish Basque singer
- David Garcia Zubiria (born 1994), Spanish footballer
- Francisco Henríquez de Zubiría (1869–1933), Colombian-born French Olympic tug-of-war competitor
- José Antonio Laureano de Zubiría (1791–1863), Bishop of Durango, Mexico

== See also ==
- Zubiri (disambiguation)
