= Funes =

Funes is a Spanish surname that may refer to:

== People ==
- Angel Funes, Honduran screenwriter, director and actor
- Belén Funes (born 1984), Catalan film director
- Carlos Delcio Funes (1931–2001), Argentine politician
- Francisco Funes (born 1950), Salvadoran cyclist
- Gregorio Funes (1749–1829), Argentine statesman
- Jerónimo Domín Funes (1576–1650), Italian Roman Catholic bishop
- José Gabriel Funes (born 1963), Argentine priest and astronomer
- Juan Gilberto Funes (1963–1992), Argentine footballer
- Juan Manuel Funes (born 1966), Guatemalan football coach
- Louis de Funès (1914–1983), French actor
- Luis Funes (1882–1970), Argentine politician
- Matías Funes (1952–2015), Honduran academic and politician
- Mauricio Funes (1959–2025), President of El Salvador
- Olivier de Funès (born 1949), French actor, son of Louis de Funès
- Ramiro Funes Mori (born 1991), Argentine footballer
- Rogelio Funes Mori (born 1991), Argentine footballer
- Roque Funes (1897–1981), Argentine cinematographer
- Vicente Cabrera Funes (1944–2014), Ecuadorian writer

== Places ==
Argentina

- Funes, Santa Fe
- Deán Funes, Córdoba
- Potrero de los Funes Dam, San Luis
  - Potrero de los Funes Circuit
- Museo Carmen Funes, Neuquén

Elsewhere

- Funes, Nariño, Colombia
- Funes, Navarra, Spain
- The Italian name for Villnöß, South Tyrol, Italy

== Literature ==
- "Funes the Memorious", a short story by Jorge Luis Borges
