= Marta Zabaleta =

Argentine academic and writer (1937–2023)

Marta Raquel Hinrichsen Zabaleta
- Born: 26 June 1937; Alcorta, Argentina
- Died: 3 June 2023 (aged 85); London, England

Marta Raquel Zabaleta (26 June 1937 – 3 June 2023) was an Argentine-British economist, social scientist, writer, poet, essayist, academic and cultural promoter. She was an exile from Chile and Argentina and lived in Epping in the UK since 1976.

== Early life ==
Marta Raquel Zabaleta was born in Alcorta, Argentina on 26 June 1937. After her graduation from the National University of the Littoral in 1960, Zabaleta became a practicing National Public Accountant and Expert. After further studies at the ESCOLATINA, University of Chile, in Santiago from 1963 to 1964, her academic expertise became the economic and social development of Latin America. She then pursued and received her D.Phil. in Development Studies at the Institute of Development Studies (IDS) at Sussex University in 1989.

Zabaleta's early feminist and humanitarian vocation earned her imprisonment by the military regimes of General Juan Domingo Perón (1954) in Argentina and General Augusto Pinochet (1973) in Chile. Repatriated by a decree of the President of Argentina in 1973, she was expelled by the de facto government of Jorge Rafael Videla (1976), destined for the United Kingdom.

== Later life ==
Once in her “old” age, Zabaleta was proud of not having been broken despite being so fiercely persecuted in her struggle for a more equal world. Her work as an organizer and cultural promoter, initiated in exile, was varied, extensive, and difficult to summarize. Reflecting on her past led, among other things, to write poetry again after a thirty-year hiatus imposed by the trauma of exile.

As a writer and poet, her writings have appeared in numerous newspapers and magazines in a number of countries and on international websites, as well as her scientific work. Several of her poems were translated and/or selected for international poetry and art exhibitions and anthologies. She was the focus of several videos and documentaries in various countries and interviewed periodically for multiple reasons in Spanish and English, from 1990 onwards. Zabaleta coordinated and participated in several artistic activities at national and international level. She also founded coordinated the international network, 'Women and Arts in the World' as well as a Working Group of the Consejo Europeo de Investigaciones Sociales de América Latina [European Council of Social Research on Latin America]. Since 1992, Zabaleta has been listed as a woman, scientist and author, in about 50 biographical books, the latest of which are The International Who's Who of Women and The International Who's Who of Authors and Writers (London & New York: Routledge, 2019).

In 2003, Zabaleta was also selected by the UNRC as a female political refugee who travelled to Europe and was invited to write her history.

In 2005 she was selected among the 10 professionals awarded help by the Council for Assisting Refugee Academics to take part in the Oral History of London because of her "valuable contribution to the culture of the city". Furthermore, her personal history and her opinions about relevant topics were taped over 10 hours and will remain open to the Museum of London's public permanently.

In May 2010, at Concordia University in Montreal, Quebec, Canada, under the auspices of the XLVI Congress of the Canadian Association of Hispanists, the launch of the e-book anthology edited by Nela Rio El espacio no es un vacío, incluye todos los tiempos [Space is not an empty, it includes all time] took place. This book was dedicated to Marta Zabaleta's project "Women and words in the world."

A poetry and art tribute exhibition (paper and virtual) by the Creative Registry of the Canadian Association of Hispanists, Nevada, June 2016, was dedicated to Marta Zabaleta.

Marta Zabaleta died in London on 3 June 2023, at the age of 85.
