= Aznar =

Aznar is a Spanish and Gascon surname of Basque origin and an obsolete given name. It probably stems from old Basque "azenar(i)" ('fox', modern "azeri"). Notable people with this name include the following:

== Given name ==
- Aznar Sánchez (died 836), Duke of Gascony
- Aznar Galíndez I (died 839), Count of Aragón, Conflent, Cerdagne and Urgel
- Aznar Galíndez II (died 893), Count of Aragón

== Surname ==
- Juan Bautista Aznar-Cabañas (1860–1933), Spanish politician and prime minister briefly in 1931
- José María Aznar (born 1953), Spanish politician, conservative prime minister
- Emmanuel Aznar (1915–1970), French footballer
- Manuel Aznar Acedo (1916–2001), Spanish journalist and radio broadcaster
- Manuel Aznar Zubigaray (1894–1975), Spanish diplomat and journalist
- Pedro Aznar (born 1959), Argentine musician
