= Cyril of Barcelona =

Spanish Capuchin and missionary bishop (died after 1799)

Cyril Sieni (Cyril of Barcelona) (died after 1799) was a Spanish Capuchin and missionary bishop.

== Life ==
Sieni was born in Catalonia.

In 1772 he was sent to New Orleans as vicar-general, by the Bishop of Santiago, Jose de Echeverria, within whose jurisdiction Louisiana then was. Ecclesiastical and religious conditions were at that time very unsatisfactory. The mission was in charge of some Capuchins who were not always models of ecclesiastical virtue; their superior, Dagobert, reputed to be ignorant and corrupt, had aroused against Cyril the opposition both of Unzaga, the civil governor, and the people.

In the hope that a responsible episcopal authority would remove these obstacles, Cyril was made titular Bishop of Tricali, and auxiliary of Santiago. His delegated ecclesiastical authority extended over the seventeen parishes and twenty-one priests found in the territory now included in the States of Louisiana, Alabama, Florida, and those bordering on the western bank of the Mississippi as far as the Missouri River.

In 1772 he sent to St. Louis, then a hamlet of about two hundred inhabitants, its second pastor, Valentine. He also sent resident pastors (1781) to Pensacola and St. Augustine, Florida. During his administration, several Irish clergymen were sent to Bishop Sieni by Charles III of Spain to minister to the religious needs of the English-speaking Catholics; to each of them the king assigned an annual salary of 350 dollars, besides paying their passage.

In 1788 New Orleans was swept by a great conflagration, on which occasion the brick church of the city perished (it was rebuilt in 1794). He failed to restore ecclesiastical discipline, and displeased both Charles III and Trespalacios, Bishop of Havana, to whose care the mission was committed since 1787. Finally a royal order (1793) banished him to his native province. In 1799 he was still in Havana on his way to Spain. Hostile writers of his own day, followed by some modern historians, depict him in harsh colours.
