= Goicoechea =

Goicoechea (also spelled multiple other ways), is a surname common in Spain and Latin America. It is derived from the original Basque name Goikoetxea.

It may refer to:

== People ==
=== Football players ===
- Andoni Goikoetxea Olaskoaga (born 1956), Spanish Basque football player and coach
- Jon Andoni Goikoetxea (born 1965), Spanish Basque-Navarrese football player and later coach; FC Barcelona Dream Team member
- Mauro Goicoechea (born 1988), Uruguayan football player
- Mikel Lasa Goicoechea (born 1971), Basque football player
- Sergio Goycochea (born 1963), Argentine football player

=== Other ===
- Alejandro Goicoechea (1895–1984), co-founder of the Spanish company Talgo
- Ángel Suquía Goicoechea (1916–2006), Roman Catholic archbishop in Madrid
- Felipe de Goicoechea (1747–1814), Mexican former comandante of the Presidio of Santa Barbara and governor of the province of Baja California
- Florentino Goikoetxea (1898–1980), Basque guide who led downed Allied airmen to safety in Spain during World War II
- Jacinto Argaya Goicoechea (1903–1993), Basque Roman Catholic bishop
- Julen Goikoetxea (1985–2006), Basque cyclist
- Yannick Goïcoëchea (born 1965), French ice hockey player
- Yon Goicoechea (born 1984), Venezuelan political activist

== Places ==
- Goicoechea (canton), a subdivision in San José province, Costa Rica

== See also ==
- Talgo, "Tren Articulado Ligero Goicoechea Oriol" (Goicoechea-Oriol light articulated train)
