= Gaona =

Gaona is a Spanish surname. It may refer to:

People

- Álvaro Gaona (born 1985), Mexican boxer
- Antonio Gaona (general) (1793–1848), Mexican general
- Antonio Gaona (actor) (born 1982), Mexican actor
- Citlalli Gaona-Tiburcio, Mexican materials scientist
- Jorge Gaona (born 1985), Paraguayan footballer
- José Julio Gaona (born 1943), Mexican painter
- Juan de Gaona (1507–1560), Spanish Franciscan and Mesoamericanist
- Julio César Gaona (born 1973), Argentine footballer
- Octavio Gaona (1907–1996), Mexican professional wrestler
- Orlando Gaona Lugo (born 1990), Paraguayan footballer

Places

- Gaona, Argentina, village and rural municipality in Salta Province
