= Zavaleta =

Zavaleta or Zabaleta is a surname of Basque origin. The Basques are a people indigenous to areas of northern Spain and southern France, an historical region known as the Basque Country.

== Origin and meaning ==
Zavaleta (Zabaleta) includes a lexeme ("zabal", 'small square / courtyard' as a noun, according to linguist specialist Koldo Mitxelena) and a suffix ("eta", suffix expressing 'abundance').

== Zavaleta vs. Zabaleta ==
The surname Zabaleta is created in the Basque language by combining the root, Zabal, with the suffix, eta, hence Zabal-eta. The surname Zabaleta was changed in the Spanish Empire in the Americas to the Spanish or Castellano variant, where the "b" is changed to a "v", hence Zavaleta. The two spellings are interchangeable and represent one single family worldwide. Today, Zavaleta families have usually lived in the Americas for generations, while Zabaletas are in Spain (or more recent arrivals in the Americas).

== Notable people ==
- Armando Zabaleta, Colombian musician and songwriter
- Brian Zabaleta, Argentine footballer
- Cara Zavaleta, Model and Reality Star
- Erika Zavaleta, American ecologist and evolutionary biologist
- Eriq Zavaleta, American footballer
- Jorge Zabaleta, Chilean actor
- La Zavaleta, Mexican drag queen
- Mariano Zabaleta, Argentine tennis player
- Marta Zabaleta, Argentine-British author
- Miguel Zavaleta, Argentinian rock musician
- Nicanor Zabaleta, Spanish harpist
- Pablo Zabaleta, Argentine footballer
- Ramón Zavaleta, Peruvian cyclist
- René Zavaleta Mercado, Bolivian politician, sociologist and philosopher
- Ruth Zavaleta, Mexican politician
- Susana Zabaleta, Mexican singer and actress
