= Aramburu =

Aramburu or Aramburú, also Aranburu, is a Basque language surname. Notable people with those surnames include:

== Aramburu or Aramburú ==
=== Sportspeople ===
- Alejandro Aramburú (born 1969), Peruvian tennis player
- Chico (Francisco) Aramburu (1922–1997), Brazilian footballer
- Federico Martín Aramburú (1980–2022), Argentine rugby union player
- Izaskun Aramburu Balda (born 1975), Spanish sprint canoeist
- Jon Aramburu (born 2002), Venezuelan footballer
- Jokin Mujika Aramburu (born 1962), Spanish cyclist
- Juan José Aramburu (born 1981), Spanish Olympic skeet shooter
- Mateo Aramburu (born 1998), Uruguayan footballer
- Patricio Arabolaza Aramburu (1893–1935), Spanish footballer

=== Other people ===
- Augustín Cosme Damián de Iturbide y Arámburu (1783–1824), Emperor of Mexico
- Alejandro Aramburú (born 2004), Peruvian singer, songwriter and actor, member of Latin boy band Santos Bravos
- Fernando Aramburu (born 1959), Spanish writer
- Ileana Aramburu-Lochte, mother of the American swimmer Ryan Lochte
- José de Arteche Aramburu (1906–1971), Basque author
- Joseba Arregui Aramburu (1946–2021), Spanish politician, theologian, and academic
- Juan Carlos Aramburu (1912–2004), the Roman Catholic Archbishop of Buenos Aires, Argentina, from 1975 to 1990
- Juan José Flores y Aramburu (1800–1864), Venezuelan-born military general who became President of the Republic of Ecuador
- Manuel Fernando de Aramburú y Frías (1777–1843), Río de la Plata colonel
- Nekane Aramburu (born 1965), Spanish art historian
- Pedro Eugenio Aramburu (1903–1970), Army General and president of Argentina from 1955 to 1958

== Aranburu ==
- Alex Aranburu (born 1995), Spanish cyclist
- Aritz Aranburu (born 1985), Spanish surfer
- Maite Aranburu, Basque politician
- Markel Irizar Aranburu (born 1980), Spanish cyclist
- Mikel Aranburu (born 1979), Spanish footballer
- Mikel Aranburu Urtasun (born 1955), Navarrese politician
- Nagore Aranburu (born 1976), Basque actress
- Unax Agote Aranburu (born 2003), Spanish footballer
- Xabier Castillo Aranburu (born 1986), Spanish footballer

== Other uses ==
- Aramburu Island, California
- Comunidad Andina-Aramburú (Metropolitano), former name of a railway station in Lima, Peru
