= Bengoetxea =

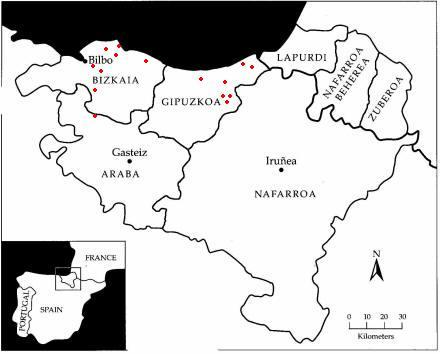
Red dots indicate where the last name can be found.

Bengoetxea (Basque modern spelling), Bengoechea (or Vengoechea, Spanish spellings) or Bengoetchea (French spelling) is a Basque surname which is common all throughout the Basque Country, especially in cities such as Murelaga, Lizarza, Alkitza, Aizarna, Aulestia, Igeldo (San Sebastián), Oiartzun, Aia, Olaberria, Lazkao, Berrobi (Tolosa) and Zizurkil in Gipuzkoa; Valley of Orozko, Mungia, Zeberio, Mundaka and Galdakao in Biscay; and in Arrieta and Baranbio (Amurrio) in Alava.

== Meaning ==
A derivative of Bengoetxea or Bengoetxe, the name literally means down-more-of-house-the (be-en-go-etxe-a), translated into English as "the house of further down" and translated into Spanish as "la casa de más abajo". It comes from "been", superlative of "be" (inferior part) and "etxe" (house).

The Bengoechea coat of arms is: in gold, a tree of sinople (green), and crossed to its trunk, two bulls of sable (black).

== Notable bearers ==
- Eduardo Bengoechea, Argentine tennis player
- Fernando Bengoechea, Argentine photographer
- Hernando de Bengoechea, French-Colombian poet
- Javier de Bengoechea, Basque poet
- Jose Antonio Bengoechea, Basque-American businessman
- Jose Antonio Urrutikoetxea Bengoetxea, Basque member of ETA
- Mercedes Bengoechea, Spanish linguist
- Oinatz Bengoetxea, Bengoetxea VI (born 1984), player of Basque pelota
- Pablo Bengoechea, Uruguayan footballer
- Zenón de Somodevilla y Bengoechea, Marquis of Ensenada, Spanish statesman

== See also ==
- Bengoechea Hotel
