= Vizcarra =

Vizcarra (sometimes spelled as "Viscarra") is a Basque surname which originated in the town of Guernica, Spain. This surname is mostly found in the Basque Country, Mexico, Peru, Bolivia and the Philippines. People with this surname include:

- Joan Vizcarra, Spanish cartoonist
- José Vizcarra, soccer player for the Canalla team in Argentina
- José Antonio Vizcarra, Governor of New Mexico from 1822 to 1823
- Manuel Vizcarra, founder of the city of Mexicali, Baja California, Mexico
- Martín Vizcarra, President of Perú from 2018 to 2020
- Mario Vizcarra, Peru First politician and brother of former Peruvian president Martín Vizcarra.

== Other uses ==
- Vizcarra, a fictional planet in the Star Wars franchise
