= Garamendi =

Garamendi is a Basque surname. Notable people with the surname include:

- John Garamendi (born 1945), American businessman and politician
- Olatz Garamendi (born 1968), Spanish politician
