= Galarza =

- Place of origin: Gipuzkoa, Spain

Galarza is a surname of Basque origins. Notable people with the surname include:

- Adrián Salvador Galarza González (born 1965), Mexican politician
- Alma Galarza, Puerto Rican singer
- Ana Galarza (born 1989), Ecuadorian beauty pageant winner
- Ángel Galarza (1892–1966), Spanish politician
- Ernesto Galarza (1905–1984), Mexican-American labor activist
- Jaime Galarza Zavala (born 1930), Ecuadorian writer, poet, journalist and politician
- Kenny Galarza (born 1985), Puerto Rican boxer
- Marcos Galarza (born 1984), Argentine footballer
- Mariano Galarza (born 1986), Argentine rugby union player
- Matías Galarza (born 2002), Argentine footballer
- Matías Galarza (born 2002), Paraguayan footballer
- Sergio Galarza (born 1975), Bolivian footballer
- Valentín Galarza Morante (1882–1951), Spanish politician
