= Francisco Javier Errázuriz Larraín =

Chilean merchant, farmer, politician and alderman

- Born: Francisco Javier Errázuriz Larraín; 3 February 1711; Aranaz, Navarra – Spain
- Died: 8 September 1767; Santiago, Chile
- Occupations: merchant, farmer, politician, Mayor and alderman

Francisco Javier de Errázuriz y Larraín or Francisco Javier Errázuriz Larraín (Aranaz, Navarra, Spain, 3 February 1711 – Santiago of Chile on 8 September 1767) was a merchant, farmer, politician, Mayor and alderman chileno.

It is the trunk of one of the most important colonial families of Santiago to which many political and social advances were due.

== Origin ==
Born in Aranaz on 3 February 1711, Navarra, he was the son of Lorenzo de Errázuriz and Vergara and of Micaela de Larraín and Córdova both of Navarra.

== Arrival in the kingdom of Chile ==
The origins of the Errázuriz family can be traced back to the Spanish Castilian (peninsular) immigration of the 18th century. He arrivide to America in 1733, arriving at the kingdom of Chile in 1735.
This young Navarran, Francisco Javier Errázuriz Larraín, arrived attracted by the possibilities of joining the business of his uncle Santiago Larraín. Thus, helped by a vast family network of uncles and cousins by Larraín, he was able to venture into mercantile business, consolidating as a merchant, establishing himself in Santiago de Chile. In 1738 Errázuriz had entered fully into the field of work in this country. Proof of this is his testament that year when he leaves for Lima. In Santiago de Chile, he obtained the positions of trust of the Spanish crown and were mayor and perpetual alderman.

== Family ==
He contracted marriage in the cathedral church in 1739 with María Loreto de Madariaga, daughter of the Official Treasurer of the Royal Cajas of the Kingdom of Chile, Francisco de Madariaga and Aris Arrieta.
The children of the Errázuriz Madariaga marriage were six women and four men. The greatest of them was Francisco Javier(1744); followed by María del Carmen (1745), José Antonio (1747), Francisca (1748), María (1749), María Dolores (1750), Domingo (1754), Santiago (1755), Rosa (1756) and María Loreto (1760).

Two of the women died girls (María Dolores and María Loreto), two others were nuns (Francisca and Rosa). Only Maria del Carmen contracted marriage with the corregidor Luis Manuel Zañartu, with whom she had two daughters who were locked up by her father in the Monastery of the Carmen down San Rafael, which she founded expressly for this purpose.

Loreto de Madariaga was sister of the Cardinal Madariaga, who had outstanding performance in the nascent republic of Venezuela. History says that when Governor Vicente Emparan gathered the neighbors to ask for their support to the King of Spain, it was the Cardinal Madariaga who first gave the cry of freedom that would lead Venezuela to obtain its independence.

=== Descendant ===
Regarding the male, José Antonio and Domingo were priests and Santiago got married without leaving offspring. Of this first generation, only the firstborn Francisco Javier de Errázuriz Madariaga, merchant and landowner like his father, continued with the family lineage, from which the Erráuriz Aldunate family arose, by marrying Rosa Martínez de Aldunate, daughter of an important official of the Crown and one of the most remarkable families of Santiago of Chile.

== His descendants include four presidents of Chile ==
- Fernando Errázuriz Aldunate, 1831
- Federico Errázuriz Zañartu, 1871 to 1876
- Federico Errázuriz Echaurren, 1896 to 1901
- Germán Riesco Errázuriz, 1901 to 1906

== See also ==
- History of Chile
