= Loyola (surname) =

Loyola is a Basque surname. Notable people with the surname include:

- Ángel Custodio Loyola (1926–1985), Venezuelan singer and composer
- Carlos Díaz Loyola (1894–1968), Chilean poet, known as Pablo de Rokha
- Ignacio Loyola Vera (born 1954), Mexican politician
- Ignatius of Loyola (1491–1556), Catholic saint and founder of the Society of Jesus
- José Inácio Candido de Loyola (1891–1973), Goan Catholic independence activist
- Juan Loyola (1952–1999), Venezuelan artist
- Margot Loyola (1918–2015), Chilean musician
- Martín Ignacio de Loyola (1550–1616), Franciscan friar and circumnavigator
