= Errázuriz =

Errázuriz is a surname. Notable people with the surname include:

- Amalia Errázuriz de Subercaseaux (1860–1930), Chilean writer
- Blanca Errázuriz (1894–1940), Chilean socialite
- Crescente Errázuriz (1839–1931), Chilean Roman Catholic friar and archbishop, professor, writer and historian
- Eugenia Errázuriz (1860–1951), Chilean patron of the arts and a style leader
- Federico Errázuriz:
  - Federico Errázuriz Zañartu (1825–1877), president of Chile from 1871 to 1876
  - Federico Errázuriz Echaurren (1850–1901), president of Chile from 1896 to 1901
- Francisco Errázuriz:
  - Francisco Javier Errázuriz Ossa, Chilean Catholic cardinal
  - Francisco Javier Errázuriz Larraín (1711–1767), Chilean merchant, farmer and politician
  - Francisco Javier Errázuriz Talavera, Chilean politician
  - Federico Errázuriz Zañartu (1825–1877), Chilean politician
- Jaime Errázuriz (born 1923), Chilean alpine skier
- José Antonio Errázuriz (1747–1821), Chilean Roman Catholic priest and politician
- Juan Ignacio González Errázuriz (born 1956), Chilean Roman Catholic bishop
- León Errázuriz, Chilean filmmaker
- María Errázuriz (1861–1922), First Lady of Chile
- Maximiano Errázuriz
  - Maximiano Errázuriz Valdivieso (1832–1890), Chilean politician, industrialist and winemaker
  - Maximiano Errázuriz Valdés (1895–1950), Chilean diplomat and politician
  - Maximiano Errázuriz Eguiguren (born 1945), Chilean politician
- Paz Errázuriz (born 1944), Chilean photographer
- Rafael Errázuriz Urmeneta (1861–1923), Chilean politician and diplomat
- Virginia Errázuriz (born 1941), Chilean painter, professor, printmaker and draftsperson

== See also ==
- Errázuriz Family
