= Ezcurra =

Ezcurra is a surname. Notable people with the surname include:

- Alma Ezcurra (born 1986), Spanish politician
- Bautista Ezcurra (born 1995), Argentine rugby union player
- Encarnación Ezcurra (1795–1838), Argentine political activist
- Exequiel Ezcurra (born 1950), Argentine plant ecologist and conservationist
- Felipe Ezcurra (born 1993), Argentine rugby union player
- María Lacunza Ezcurra (1900–1984), Spanish lawyer and pioneer
- Martín Ezcurra (born 1987), Argentine palaeontologist
- Pedro de Ezcurra (1859–1911), Argentine politician
