= Amestoy =

Amestoy is a surname. Notable people with the surname include:

- Domingo Amestoy (1822–1892), Basque sheepherder and banker
- Jeffrey Amestoy (born 1946), American lawyer and politician
- Juan Pedro Amestoy (1925–2010), Uruguayan accountant, politician, and ambassador
