= Mateo García Elizondo =

Mexican writer (born 1987)

Mateo García Elizondo (Note: In this Mexican name, the surname is García and the second or maternal family name is Elizondo.) (born 1987) is a Mexican writer. He was born in Mexico City, and studied literature and creative writing at the University of Westminster in London.

His first novel, Una cita con la Lady, (2019) tells the story of an addict planning to end his life in a provincial Mexican town; David Marcial Pérez, writing in El País, noted the obvious parallels with Juan Rulfo's Pedro Páramo. It won the City of Barcelona Award. He also engages in other forms of writing: magazine pieces (e.g. for Nexos), graphic novel scripts (e.g. for Premier Comics), and film scripts (for the film Desierto.)

Garcia Elizondo was named by Granta magazine as one of the best young writers in the Spanish language in 2021. He is the grandson of writers Gabriel García Márquez and Salvador Elizondo.
