= Betelu =

Municipality of Spain

Coordinates: 43°01′32″N 1°58′46″W

Coat of arms

Betelu is a town and municipality located in the province and autonomous community of Navarre, northern Spain. The Mariñelarena family has its origins in the village and was prominent in politics and government.

Betelu is known for the natural springs that produce a unique mineral water. Entering the town from the southeast, one passes along the location of the natural springs. A park has been developed here, with a small concrete dam to hold the river in place, allowing swimming. There is also an interpretive walk that includes Spanish and Basque descriptions of the natural mineral water and its unique qualities, as well as the ancient structures that were built here to use the water's power for working locally mined metals in a foundry.
