= Elizalde =

Elizalde is a surname that originated in Spain and may refer to:

== Persons ==
- Founders of Elizade & Company and Elizalde Holdings Corporation
  - Fred Elizalde (1907–1979), Filipino musician and bandleader
  - Joaquín Miguel Elizalde (1896–1965), Filipino diplomat and businessman
  - Manolo Elizalde, Filipino businessman
- Álvaro Elizalde (born 1969), Chilean politician and lawyer
- Betty Elizalde (1940–2018), Argentine journalist and broadcaster
- Edgar Elizalde (born 2000), Uruguayan footballer
- Emilio Elizalde (born 1950), Spanish physicist
- Francisco Elizalde (born 1932), Filipino sports official
- Jesús Elizalde Sainz de Robles (1907–1980), Spanish Carlist politician
- Manuel Elizalde (1936–1997), Filipino entrepreneur
- Mike Elizalde (born 1960), Mexican make-up artist
- Valentín Elizalde (1979–2006), Mexican vocalist

== Companies ==
- Elizalde (automobile), Spanish automobile manufacturer
- Elizalde Holdings Corporation, owners of Manila Broadcasting Company
