= Mendieta =

Mendieta is a Basque and Spanish surname. Notable people with the surname include:

- Ana Mendieta (1948–1985), Cuban-American artist
- Ascención Mendieta (1925–2019), Spanish activist
- Carlos Mendieta (1873–1960), Cuban politician
- Gaizka Mendieta (born 1974), Spanish footballer
- Gerónimo de Mendieta (1525–1604), Franciscan missionary and historian
- Junior Mendieta (born 1993), Argentine footballer
- Víctor René Mendieta Jr. (born 1982), footballer
- William Mendieta (born 1989), Paraguayan footballer
