= Laxalt =

Laxalt is a Basque surname and may refer to:

- Adam Laxalt (born 1978), American politician from Nevada
- Diego Laxalt (born 1993), Uruguayan footballer
- Paul Laxalt (1922–2018), American politician from Nevada
- Pedro Laxalt (1900–1965), Argentine actor
- Robert Laxalt (1923–2001), Basque-American writer
