= Larraín =

Larraín or Larrain is a surname of Basque origin.

== Geographical distribution ==
As of 2014, 71.1% of all known bearers of the surname Larraín were residents of Chile (frequency 1:4,907), 12.1% of Peru (1:52,191), 6.0% of Argentina (1:140,143), 4.4% of the United States (1:1,627,258), 1.2% of Venezuela (1:487,166) and 1.2% of Spain (1:789,657).

In Spain, the frequency of the surname was higher than national average (1:789,657) in the following autonomous communities:

1. Balearic Islands (1:182,486)
2. Basque Country (1:240,098)
3. Community of Madrid (1:400,415)
4. Andalusia (1:489,591)
5. Navarre (1:636,611)
6. Catalonia (1:745,221)

In Chile, the frequency of the surname was higher than national average (1:4,907) in only one region:

1. Santiago Metropolitan Region (1:2,720)

== People ==
- Carlos Larraín, a Chilean lawyer and politician
- Fernando Larraín, a Chilean television actor, comedian
- Felipe Larraín, a Chilean economist
- Gabriel Larraín Valdivieso, a Chilean Catholic bishop
- Gilles Larrain, an American photographer
- Hernán Larraín, a Chilean politician
- Joaquín Larraín Gandarillas, a Chilean priest
- Luis Larraín, a Chilean LGBT rights activist
- Luis Alfonzo Larrain, a Venezuelan composer
- María Eugenia Larraín, a Chilean female model
- Nicolás Larraín, a Chilean television presenter
- Pablo Larraín, a Chilean filmmaker
- Patricia Larraín, a Chilean actress and TV hostess
- Sara Larraín, a Chilean politician and environmentalist
- Teresa Larraín, a Chilean First Lady
- Julita Astaburuaga Larraín, a Chilean socialite
- Emiliano Figueroa Larraín, President of Chile in 1925–1927
- Joaquín Figueroa Larraín, a Chilean politician
- Juan Francisco Fresno Larraín, a Chilean cardinal
- Arturo Matte Larraín, a Chilean lawyer and politician
- Eliodoro Matte Larraín, President of conservative and influential think-tank Public Studies Center (Centro de Estudios Públicos, CEP)
- María Patricia Matte Larraín, President of the Primary Instruction Society, owner of several schools for poor children in Santiago
- Claudio Orrego Larraín, a Chilean lawyer and politician
- María José Prieto Larraín, a Chilean actress
- Francisco Ramón Vicuña Larraín, a President of Chile in 1829
- Adolfo Zaldívar Larraín, a Chilean politician and lawyer
- Andrés Zaldívar Larraín, a Chilean Christian Democrat politician
- Lasco James Larrain, son of Gilles Larrain
- Manuel Gerardo, Marquis de Larrain, a Chilean-Canadian artist and the titular 52nd Prince of Tyrone (See also O'Neills of Tyrone)
- Martin Larrain, son of Carlos Larrain, that killed Hernan Canales while driving under the influence, in September 2013

== See also ==
- Larraín family, a prominent Chilean family.
- Larraín Alcalde, a settlement in Pichilemu, Chile
