= Carlos Delcio Funes =

Argentine politician

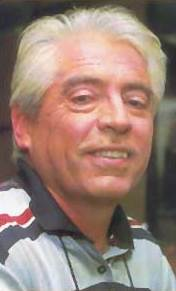
Senator Carlos Delcio Funes

Carlos 'Chango' Delcio Funes (1931 in San Justo, Córdoba – 29 July 2001 in Buenos Aires) was an Argentine Justicialist Party politician in Santa Fe Province.

Funes was a journalist and writer. In 1971 he became involved in politics, taking a job in government as an assistant at COMYPE. During the military government he worked in Rosario, returning to politics in 1982.

In 1993 Funes was elected to the Argentine Chamber of Deputies, serving until 1997. In 1999 he became a provincial deputy. He was appointed to the Argentine Senate in March 2001, replacing Arturo di Pietro who had died in office. Funes himself died while in office of cancer after a long illness at the Güemes hospital in Buenos Aires not long afterwards.
