= Amézaga =

Amézaga is a surname of Basque origin. Notable people with the surname include:

- Alfredo Amézaga (born 1978), Mexican baseball player and coach
- Izaskun Uranga Amézaga (born 1950), Spanish musician
- Juan José de Amézaga (1881–1956), Uruguayan politician
