= Zabala (surname) =

Zabala is a surname of Basque origin. Notable people with the surname include:

- Adrián Zabala (1916–2002), Cuban baseball player
- Aneurys Zabala (born 1996), Dominican baseball player
- Artemio Zabala (born 1935), Filipino Episcopalian bishop
- Bruno Mauricio de Zabala (1682–1736), Spanish soldier and colonial administrator
- Buddy Zabala (born 1971), Filipino musician
- Cedric Bixler-Zavala (born 1974), American musician
- César Zabala (born 1961), Paraguayan football player
- Cristian Zabala (born 1998), Argentine football player
- Diego Zabala (born 1991), Uruguayan football player
- Esperanza Zabala (born 1974), Spanish Basque artist
- Felix "Tuto" Zabala (1936–2021), Cuban boxing promoter and manager
- Gaizka Mendieta Zabala (born 1974), Spanish football player
- Herminio Díaz Zabala (born 1964), Spanish racing cyclist
- Josu Zabala (born 1993), Spanish cyclist
- Juan Carlos Zabala (1911–1983), Argentine athlete
- Loida Zabala (born 1987), Spanish Paralympic powerlifter
- Louis Zabala (born 2001), Australian football player
- Natalia Zabala (born 1983), Spanish beauty pageant titleholder
- Natalia Zabala Chacur (born 1978), Argentine politician
- Paula Zabala (born 1985), Colombian tennis player
- Pedro Zabála (born 1983), Bolivian football player
- Pilar Zabala Aguirre (born 1951), Spanish researcher, writer, and professor
- Ronald Zabala-Goetschel (born 1966), Ecuadorian equestrian
- Santiago Zabala (born 1975), Spanish philosopher
- Tincho Zabala (1923–2001), Uruguayan film actor
- Wilder Zabala (born 1982), Bolivian football player
- Zeny Zabala (1934–2017), Filipina actress
