= Felipe Francisco Molina y Bedoya =

Costa Rican diplomat (??–1855)

Felipe Francisco Molina y Bedoya was a diplomat from Costa Rica, born in the city of Guatemala. He became Chancellor of the Federal Republic of Central America.

He studied in Philadelphia. He became minister plenipotentiary of Costa Rica for Nicaragua, where he signed the Molina-Juárez treaty, which concerned the borders between both countries. He later became the Costa Rican minister plenipotentiary for the UK, France, Spain, The Holy See and the United States.

In 1850 in Madrid, he signed the Molina-Pidal treaty in which Spain recognised Costa Rican independence. During this time he also published a book describing Costa Rica for the European Public. He also signed the Molina-Webster treaty with the U.S., the Molina-Tosta treaty with the Netherlands and the Molina-Marcoleta treaty with Nicaragua.

== Personal life ==
Born to Pedro Molina Mazariegos and María Dolores Bedoya (being brother of Luis and Manuel Ángel Molina Bedoya), he died in Washington, D.C., USA in 1855.
