= Rosendo Mendizábal =

Argentine musician (1868–1913)

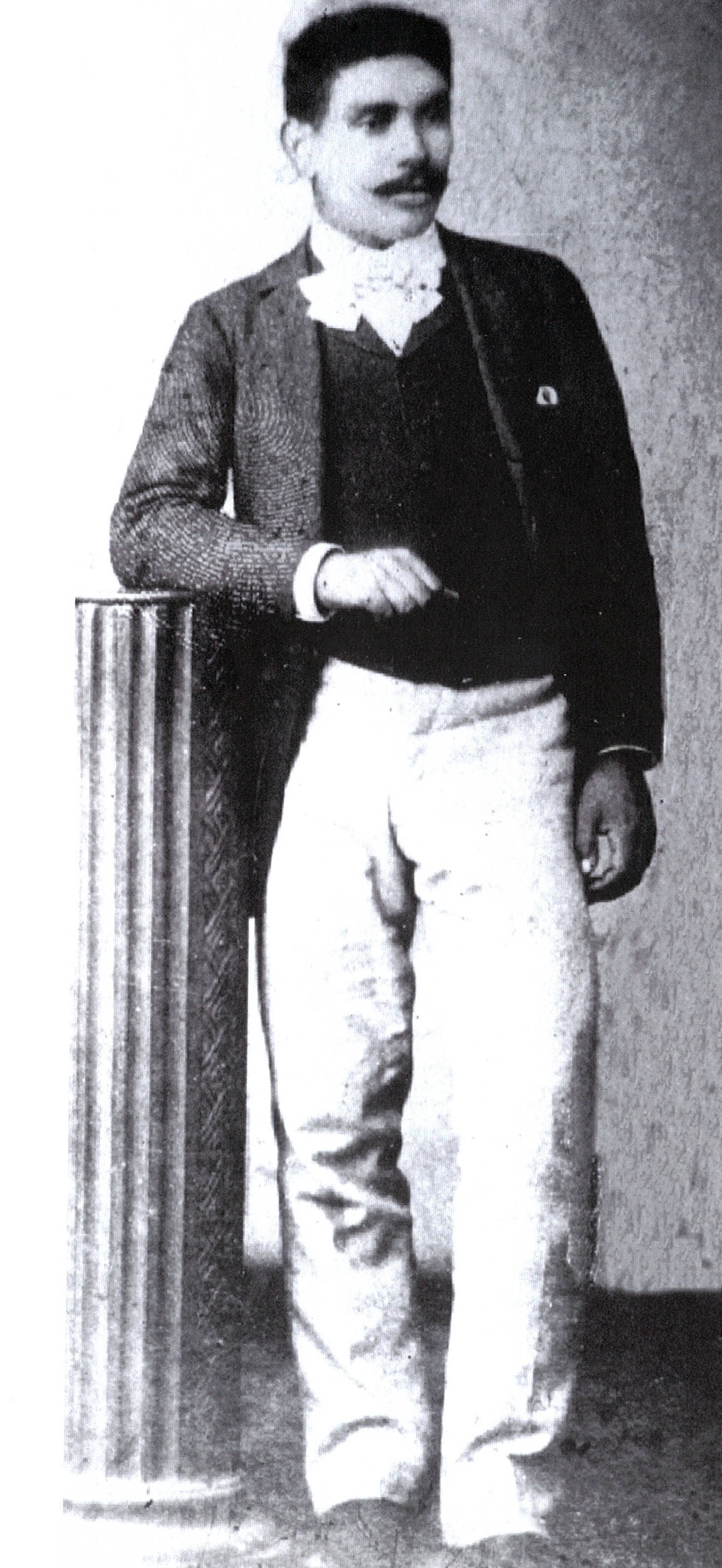
Rosendo Mendizábal

Anselmo Rosendo Cayetano Mendizábal (21 April 1868 – 30 June 1913) was an Argentine composer and pianist, and an early pioneer of the tango. Among his most renown works is El Entrerriano, the first tango published under partiture in 1897.

== Early life ==
Mendizábal was born on 21 April 1868 in Buenos Aires to a prosperous Afro-Argentine family. His father, Horacio Mendizábal (1847–1871) was a writer and poet, while his grandfather, also named Rosendo, was a pioneer Afro-Argentine politician and member of the Buenos Aires Legislature. Horacio Mendizábal died when Rosendo was only three years old, leaving him and his brother orphans.

== Tangos ==
On October 25, 1897, Rosendo released his first piano piece, "La casita" (elegant brothel). His first structured tango was "El entrerriano". It was the beginning of structured tango presents three parts, unlike the primitive examples of one or two parts.

Mendizabal signed his works using the name "A. Rosendo".

On occasion, Mendizábal directed a quintet in the Hall Saint Martin (Rodriguez Peña 344). The other players were Ernesto Ponzio (violin), Vincent Pecci (flute), Eusebio Aspiazu (guitar), and "Cieguito" Gaudin (unknown instrument).

In addition to his best known work, "El entrerriano" (still performed), his compositions included "Don Padilla", "Oh, How Expensive", "That's the Thing", "In the Long Run", "The Torpedo", "Soon Return", "Entre La", "Matilda", "Queen of Sheba", "Wind in its Sails", "Tigre Hotel", "Around Here There Are no Thorns", "In Light of the Lanterns", "Le Petit Parisién", "Club Z", "Don Enrique", "Alberto" and "Somos Line".

Mendizábal died on June 30, 1913.
