= Hernando de Bengoechea =

French poet

- Born: 1889; Paris, France
- Died: May 1915 (aged 25–26); Artois, France
- Occupation: Poet

Hernando de Bengoechea (1889 – May 1915) was a French-Colombian poet who was killed in the First World War.

== Biography ==
Born in Paris to Colombian parents, he was a literary figure of the Belle Epoque. When war broke out in August 1914, he volunteered to fight and was soon incorporated into the French Foreign Legion. He was killed during the Artois offensive in May 1915. Partly because he had chosen to adopt a Colombian passport over a French one, Bengoechea's death was widely reported and mourned in Colombia.

Although fluent in both Spanish and French, Bengoechea wrote mainly in French. His poems are available in a volume entitled Les Crépuscules du matin. He left around forty letters from the front, which dealt with subjects such as life in the trenches, his love of Paris, France, and the French language, his desire to maintain an intellectual life in spite of his harsh circumstances, etc. The main recipients were his mother, his brother Alfred, his sister Elvira, the brothers García Calderón, his best friend Diego Suárez Costa, Baroness Renée Franchon, Countess Moltke-Huitfeld, etc. One of his correspondents was Jose Garcia Calderon, a young writer of Peruvian origin, who also died in action, a year after Bengoechea's death.

Hernando's elder brother, Alfred de Bengoechea, a poet and translator, published his letters after the war, in a volume entitled Le Sourire de l'Ile-de-France : Essais et poèmes en prose, suivis des Lettres de guerre, 1914–1915. This book, illustrated by E.-A. Bourdelle, appeared in 1924. Twenty-four years later, in 1948, Alfred published a selection of the works of his dead brother, with a long preface by Hernando's friend, Léon-Paul Fargue (also a poet), under the title: Hernando de Bengoechea ou l’Âme d’un poète.
