= Uriburu =

Uriburu is a Basque language surname of Basque origin, which means "head of town" in the Basque language, from uri ("town") and buru ("head" or "high part"). An alternative spelling is Uruburu. The surname may refer to:

- Federico Uruburu (1934–2003), Spanish biologist
- Francisco Uriburu (1837–1906), Argentine businessman and politician
- José Félix Uriburu (1868–1932), de facto President of Argentina from 1930 to 1932
- José Evaristo Uriburu (1831–1914), President of Argentina from 1895 to 1898
- José C. Uriburu (1914–1996), Argentine politician
- Mario Uriburu (1901–1964), Argentine sailor
- Nicolás García Uriburu (1937–2016), Argentine artist
