= Iriondo =

Iriondo is a surname. Notable people with the surname include:

- Antonio Iriondo (born 1953), former Spanish football player and manager
- Iban Iriondo (born 1984), Spanish professional road bicycle racer
- Josu Iriondo (born 1938), Spanish American prelate of the Roman Catholic Church
- Rafael Iriondo (1918–2016), former Spanish football player and manager
- Simón de Iriondo (1836–1883), Argentine politician of the National Autonomist Party

== See also ==
- Iriondo Department, administrative subdivision of the province of Santa Fe, Argentina
