= Zuluaga =

Zuluaga is a surname. Notable people with the surname include:

- Antonio Zuluaga (1931–2012), Colombian painter and sculptor
- Arnold Zuluaga (born 1983), Peruvian football player
- Camila Zuluaga (born 1985), Colombian television journalist
- David Zuluaga (born 1956), Peruvian football player
- Fabiola Zuluaga (born 1979), Colombian tennis player
- Francisco Zuluaga (1929–1993), Colombian football player
- Luz Marina Zuluaga (1938-2015), Miss Universe winner from Colombia
- Óscar Iván Zuluaga (born 1959), Colombian politician
