= Iturbi =

Iturbi is a Basque-language surname. Notable people with the surname include:

- José Iturbi (1895–1980), Spanish conductor and pianist
- Dame Amparo Iturbi Baguena (1898–1969), Spanish concert pianist, sister of José
