= Elizondo =

Elizondo is a Basque place-name and surname meaning "(house) beside the church". It may refer to:

== Places ==
- Elizondo, Navarre, a town in northeast Spain

== People with the surname ==
- Andoni Elizondo (1932–1986), Spanish soccer player and coach
- Arturo Elizondo, American entrepreneur and inventor
- Carlos Elizondo (born 1962), American political aide
- César Elizondo (born 1988), Costa Rican soccer player
- Domingo Elizondo (died 1783), 18th century Spanish colonel
- Evangelina Elizondo (1929–2017), Mexican actress and singer
- Everardo Elizondo (born 1943), Mexican economist
- Felicia Elizondo (1946–2021), American transgender activist
- Fernanda Elizondo (born 1991), Mexican soccer player
- Fernando Elizondo Barragán (born 1949), Mexican senator
- Hernán Elizondo Arce (1921–2012), Costa Rican writer
- Horacio Elizondo (born 1963), Argentine soccer referee
- Humberto Elizondo (born 1947), Mexican actor
- Ignacio Elizondo (1766–1813), 19th century Mexican general and turncoat
- Jaime Elizondo, Mexican football coach
- Javier Elizondo (born 1982), Argentine soccer player
- José Rodríguez Elizondo (born 1936), Chilean diplomat and lawyer
- Juan-Carlos Elizondo (born 1975), Mexican alpine skier
- Juan Manuel Elizondo (born 1983), Mexican tennis player
- Laura Elizondo (born 1983), Mexican model and beauty queen
- Luis Elizondo, American activist and author
- Mateo García Elizondo (born 1987), Mexican writer
- Mike Elizondo (born 1972), American musician and producer
- Pedro Pablo Elizondo (1949–2026), Mexican Catholic prelate
- Rafael Elizondo (born 1954), Costa Rican weightlifter
- René Elizondo Jr. (born 1962), Mexican dancer, songwriter, and music video director
- Ricardo Elizondo Elizondo (1950–2013), Mexican writer
- Roberto Elizondo (born 1955), American boxer
- Rodolfo Elizondo Torres (born 1946), Mexican politician
- Salvador Elizondo (1932–2006), Mexican writer
- Teodoro Elizondo (1862–1936), Mexican general
- Virgilio Elizondo (1935–2016), Mexican–American Catholic priest
- Wálter Elizondo (1942–2018), Costa Rican soccer player
