= Armendáriz =

Armendáriz is a Basque surname that may refer to:

- Alejandro Armendáriz, an Argentine physician and politician, governor of Buenos Aires province (1983–1987)
- José de Armendáriz, a Spanish soldier and colonial administrator
- Lope Díez de Armendáriz, a Spanish nobleman and viceroy of New Spain
- Luis Díez de Aux y Armendáriz, a Spanish clergyman and Viceroy of Catalonia
- Montxo Armendáriz, an awarded Spanish screenwriter and film director
- Pedro Armendáriz, a Mexican actor
- Pedro Armendáriz Jr., a Mexican actor and son of Pedro Armendáriz
- Ramon Armendariz, American baseball umpire
- Saúl Armendáriz, Mexican professional wrestler
