= Domingo Amestoy =

Basque sheepherder and banker (c. 1822–1892

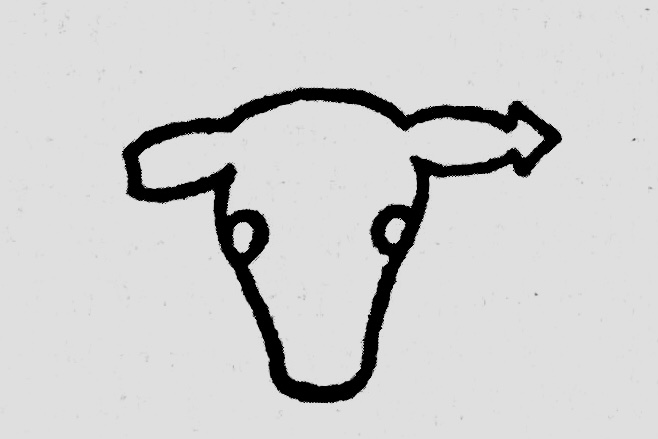
Cattle brand of Domingo Amestoy

Domingo Amestoy —born Dominique— (c. 1822–1892) was a Basque sheepherder, and banker, one of the original founders to provide the financing for the Farmers and Merchants Bank in Los Angeles, California, in 1871.

== Life ==
Born in the Basque village of Saint-Pierre-d'Irube, France, Domingo Amestoy came to California by way of Argentina in 1851. Amestoy started a modest sheep business and within a few years he parlayed it into a fortune. He was one of the largest wool producers in Southern California during the 1860s. In 1871, he bought $500,000 worth of shares in the newly established Farmers and Merchants Bank in Los Angeles. In 1874 he went back to France and married. In 1875 Amestoy moved his family to 650 acres (2.6 km^{2}) of the "Rosecrans Rancho" in what is now Gardena. By 1880, he had over 30,000 head of sheep, most of which were fine-wooled Spanish merinos.

In 1889 he acquired all 4,500 acres (18 km^{2}) of Rancho Los Encinos in the San Fernando Valley. After Domingo Amestoy died on January 11, 1892, his sons, John and Peter Amestoy, assumed ranch operations and changed the name to Amestoy ranch. Like other ranches in the San Fernando Valley at the time, the Amestoys cultivated wheat and barley. The Amestoy family held title to rancho for fifty-five years. In 1915, subdivision of the rancho began later developing into the communities of Sherman Oaks and Encino. The Amestoys held on to 100 acres (0.40 km^{2}), which included the old adobe until selling the property in 1944.

== Legacy ==
Amestoy Elementary School in Gardena, California was named in his honor. Amestoy Avenue in the San Fernando Valley was named in his honor. Amestoy Avenue runs approximately 7 miles (11 km) North-South through the neighborhoods of Encino, Reseda, Northridge, and Granada Hills from Ventura Boulevard (interrupted) to the 118 Freeway.
