= Duhalde =

The Basque surname Duhalde can refer to:

- Alfredo Duhalde (1898–1985), ex-provisional Chilean president
- Eduardo Duhalde (born 1941), Argentine president
- Hilda González de Duhalde (born 1946), Argentine Senator
- Jean-Baptiste Du Halde (1674–1743), French jesuit, specialized in Chinese history
- Margot Duhalde (1920–2018), Chilean pilot
