= María Lacunza Ezcurra =

Pioneer Spanish lawyer

María Lacunza Ezcurra (Pamplona, 29 September 1900 – Valencia, 4 May 1984 ) was the first collegiate woman in professional schools of San Sebastián and Pamplona in 1927. She was part of a small nucleus of six Spanish women pioneer lawyers who were able to defend a case in the Spanish Courts of Justice before the Spanish Civil War. She was also Secretary of the Ministry of Agriculture.
