= Ormazábal =

Ormazábal is a Basque surname. Notable people with the surname include:

- Asier Ormazábal Larizgoitia (born 1982), Spanish footballer
- Manuel Ormazábal Pino (born 1983), Chilean footballer
- Patricio Ormazábal Mozó (born 1979), Chilean footballer
- Ramón Ormazábal Tife (1910–1982), Basque communist politician
- Víctor Ormazábal (born 1985), Argentinian footballer
