= Urdaneta =

Urdaneta is a name of Basque origin; it may refer to:

== People ==
- Abelardo Rodríguez Urdaneta (1870–1933), Dominican sculptor
- Andrés de Urdaneta (1498–1568), Basque Spanish explorer
- Ángel Alfonso Bravo Urdaneta (born 1942), Venezuelan baseball player
- Betty Urdaneta, Venezuelan First Lady, 1979–1984
- Gabriel Urdaneta (born 1976), Venezuelan football player
- Isabel Sánchez de Urdaneta, Venezuelan stateswoman and feminist
- Lino Urdaneta (born 1979), Venezuelan baseball player
- Luciano Urdaneta Vargas, Venezuelan architect who designed the Palacio Federal Legislativo
- Orlando Urdaneta (born 1950), Venezuelan actor
- Óscar Sambrano Urdaneta (1929–2011), Venezuelan writer and literary critic
- Rafael Urdaneta (1788–1845), Venezuelan general
- Roberto Urdaneta Arbeláez (1890–1972), Colombian president, 1951–1953
- Yolmer Urdaneta, Venezuelan Paralympic discus thrower

== Places ==
=== Ecuador ===
- Urdaneta Canton, a canton in the province of Los Ríos
- Urdaneta, an urban parish in Guayaquil Canton, Guayas Province

=== Mexico ===
- Urdaneta, a station on Line 1 of the Guadalajara light rail system

=== Philippines ===
- Urdaneta, Pangasinan, a city in the province of Pangasinan
- Barangay Urdaneta, a section of Makati Central Business District in Metro Manila

=== Spain ===
- Barrio de Urdaneta, town in the Municipality of Aia, province of Gipuzkoa

=== Venezuela ===
- Urdaneta Municipality, Aragua, a municipality in Aragua State
- Urdaneta Municipality, Lara, a municipality in Lara State
- Urdaneta Municipality, Miranda, a municipality in Miranda State
- Urdaneta Municipality, Trujillo, a municipality in Trujillo State
- La Cañada de Urdaneta, a municipality in Zulia

== Other ==
- USS Urdaneta (1883), a US Navy gunboat
