= Hormazábal =

Hormazábal is a surname. Notable people with the surname include:

- Enrique Hormazábal (1931–1999), Chilean footballer
- Fernando Hormazábal (born 1935), Chilean military officer, engineer, academic, and consultant
- Francisco Hormazábal (1920—1990), Chilean footballer and manager
- Guillermo Hormazábal (born 1985), Chilean tennis player
- Luis Hormazábal (born 1959), Chilean footballer
