= Yannick Goïcoëchea =

French ice hockey forward

- Born: April 2, 1965 (age 60) France
- Height: 5 ft 11 in (180 cm)
- Weight: 172 lb (78 kg; 12 st 4 lb)
- Position: Forward
- Played for: Bordeaux
- National team: France
- Playing career: 1988–2001

Yannick Goïcoëchea (born April 2, 1965) is a French former ice hockey forward.

Goïcoëchea played in the Ligue Magnus for Bordeaux, from 1988 to 1991 and again from 1996 to 1999. He also served as player-coach for Bordeaux between 1999 and 2001.

He played in the 1992 World Ice Hockey Championships for France.

== Career statistics ==
			Regular season					Playoffs
Season	Team	League	GP	G	A	Pts	PIM	GP	G	A	Pts	PIM
1988–89	Boxers de Bordeaux	France	29	23	13	36	20	—	—	—	—	—
1989–90	Boxers de Bordeaux	France	35	20	17	37	26	—	—	—	—	—
1990–91	Boxers de Bordeaux	France	28	20	17	37	22	6	3	1	4	8
1991–92	Boxers de Bordeaux	France2	12	21	20	41	25	—	—	—	—	—
1992–93	Anglet Hormadi Élite	France2	22	23	25	48	44	—	—	—	—	—
1993–94	Anglet Hormadi Élite	France2	13	21	19	40	34	6	5	5	10	20
1994–95	Boxers de Bordeaux	France2	24	31	19	50	68	—	—	—	—	—
1995–96	Boxers de Bordeaux	France2	25	33	24	57	80	—	—	—	—	—
1996–97	Boxers de Bordeaux	France	32	32	26	58	36	11	5	2	7	30
1997–98	Boxers de Bordeaux	France	38	17	25	42	40	—	—	—	—	—
1998–99	Boxers de Bordeaux	France	—	—	—	—	—	—	—	—	—	—
1998–99	Bélougas de Toulouse	France2	—	2	2	4	—	—	—	—	—	—
1999–00	Boxers de Bordeaux	France4	—	—	—	—	—	—	—	—	—	—
2000–01	Boxers de Bordeaux	France3	—	—	—	—	—	—	—	—	—	—
France totals			162	112	98	210	144	17	8	3	11	38
France2 totals			96	131	109	240	251	6	5	5	10	20
