= Tellechea =

Tellechea, Tellechéa or Telletxea is a Basque-language surname. Notable people with the surname include:

== Tellechea ==
- Arturo Alonso Tellechea (born 1983), Argentine-born Spanish sailor
- Clemente Tellechea (born 1932), Argentine alpine skier
- Emiliano Tellechea (born 1987), Uruguayan footballer
- Gonzalo Tellechea (born 1985), Argentine triathlete
- Joaquín Tellechea (ca. 1761-ca. 1841), Puerto Rican-born Spanish Army sergeant major
- Matías Tellechea (born 1992), Uruguayan footballer
- Pedro Tellechea (born 1975), Venezuelan politician

== Tellechéa ==
- Joseph Tellechéa (1926–2015), French footballer

== Telletxea ==
- Domingo Perurena Teletxea (1943–2023), Spanish road racing cyclist
- Naiara Telletxea (born 1984), Spanish road cyclist
