= Etxegoien =

Hamlet in Álava, Spain

- Concejo
- Location within Álava Location within the Basque Country Location within Spain
- Coordinates: 43°N 3°W
- Country: Spain
- Autonomous community: Basque Country
- Province: Álava
- Comarca: Ayala
- Municipality: Ayala/Aiara

Area
  - Total: 1.69 km^{2} (0.65 sq mi)
- Elevation: 300 m (980 ft)

Population (2023)
  - Total: 16
  - Density: 9.5/km^{2} (25/sq mi)
- Postal code: 01470

Etxegoien (Spanish: Echegoyen) is a hamlet and concejo in the municipality of Ayala/Aiara, Álava, Basque Country, Spain.
