= Iriarte =

Iriarte is a surname. Notable people with the surname include:

- Ignacio de Iriarte (1620–1685), Spanish painter
- Tomás de Iriarte y Oropesa (1750–1791) Spanish poet
- Ana María Iriarte (1927–2025), Spanish mezzosoprano
- Alfredo Iriarte (1932–2002), Colombian historian and writer
- Frédéric Iriarte (born 1963), French painter
- Joe Iriarte (born 1986), Investment Banker
- Javier Iriarte (born 1986), Spanish road bicycle racer
- Jairo Iriarte (born 2001), Venezuelan baseball player

== See also ==
- Charles Yriarte (1832–1898), French writer
- Estación Iriarte, an area in General Pinto Partido in Buenos Aires Province
