= Citlalli Gaona-Tiburcio =

Mexican materials scientist

Citlalli Gaona-Tiburcio is a Mexican materials scientist whose research interests include the treatment of metal-reinforced concrete for resistance to corrosion, and the development of composite materials for extreme environments including high-temperature and aerospace applications. She is a professor and researcher in the Center for Research and Innovation in Aeronautical Engineering, in the Faculty of Mechanical and Electrical Engineering of the Autonomous University of Nuevo León (UANL).

== Education and career ==
Gaona-Tiburcio did her undergraduate studies in metallurgical engineering at UAM Azcapotzalco, graduating in 1993. She earned a master's degree in the subject from the National Autonomous University of Mexico in 1997, and completed a doctorate in 1999 through the Centro de Investigación en Materiales Avanzados (CIMAV).

She continued to work as a researcher for CIMAV from 1995 to 2011. In 2013 she took her present position as a professor and researcher at UANL.

== Recognition ==
Gaona-Tiburcio is a member of the Mexican Academy of Sciences.
