= Mariñelarena =

Basque surname

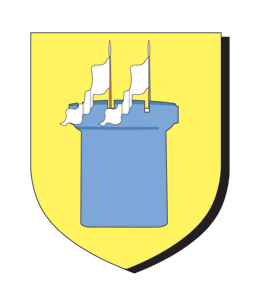
Mariñelarena Family's Coat-of-arms (2005)

Mariñelarena or Marinelarena is a Basque surname that has its origins in the village of Betelu, located north of Navarra, Spain, bordering on Gipuzkoa.

== Etymology and history ==
The surname means in the Basque language "...of the sailor". Usually modern surnames originated in the Basque Country as name of houses, being families known by the name of the house they inhabited once. Few Basque surnames were of patronymic origin, but there are some, and Mariñelarena could be one of them, meaning "(son) of the sailor". However, it could also be referring to a house: "(house) of the sailor".

== Coat-of-arms ==
Mariñelarena is a family recognized with a coat-of-arms, because most Basque families (if not all) have their nobility recognized.

It is conformed by a two Argent (silver) flags over an Azure (blue) tower with Argent (silver) small windows, that stands in an Or (gold) background.

== Familiar Lineage in Betelu ==
- Marinelarena, Miguel de; Owner of Juangorena.

- Noble neighbor on 1695

- Marinelarena, Juanes de; Owner of Ochotorena.

- Regency on 1700.

- Marinelarena, Martiarano; Owner of Juangorena.

- Regency on 1700.

- Marinelarena, Martín de; Owner of Juangorena.

- Mayor's lieutenant on 1703
- Mayor on 1712
- Regency on 1727
- Mayor on 1731
- Mayor's lieutenant on 1735
- Regency on 1738
- Regency on 1748

- Marinelarena, Lorenzo de; Owner of Garciarena.

- Regency on 1718

- Marinelarena, Juan Fermín de; Owner of Garciarena.

- Regency on 1742
- Mayor's lieutenant on 1745
- Mayor on 1747
- Mayor's lieutenant on 1749
- Regency on 1753 and 1763

- Marinelarena, Martiarano; Owner of Juangorena.

- Mayor on 1762

- Marinelarena, Martín de; Owner of Bengoechea de Suso or Juangorena & Migueltorena.

- Regency on 1773
- Mayor on 1782
- Regency on 1785

- Marinelarena, Ramón Antonio de; Owner of Garciarena & Echezarra.

- Regency on 1778
- Mayor on 1776
- Mayor's lieutenant on 1779
- Regency on 1784 and 1796
- Mayor's lieutenant on 1802 and 1804

- Marinelarena, Juan Fermín de; Owner of Echeverria & Garciarena.

- Regency on 1806
- Mayor on 1809

== Notable people sharing the surname "Mariñelarena" ==
- Álex Mariñelarena, motorcycle racer
- Erik Mariñelarena, Mexican filmmaker
- Rubén Marinelarena Gallego, Arizonian politician
