= Horacio Mendizábal =

Argentine poet, translator and activist

Horacio Mendizábal (1847–1871) was an Argentine poet, translator and activist.

== Life ==
Horacio Mendizábal was born to an Afro-Argentine upper-class family in Buenos Aires, the son of Rosendo Mendizábal, a member of the Chamber of Deputies of Buenos Aires and one of the earliest black politicians in Argentina. Publishing his first volume of poetry as a teenager, he became increasingly concerned with issues of racial equality and national independence. He died, aged 24, while tending to the sick in the 1871 yellow fever epidemic.

His son was the pianist and composer Rosendo Mendizábal.

In 2019, the Argentinian publisher Amauta&Yaguar republished the work Hours of Meditation as a tribute to 150 years of his publication. It includes a preliminary note by Federico Pita, president of Diafar (African Diaspora in Argentina), Espacio Malcolm and editor of the newspaper El Afroargentino.

== Works ==
- Primeros Versos [First Verses], 1865
- Horas de meditación [Hours of Meditation], 1869
