= Lardizábal =

Lardizábal is a surname. Notable people with the surname include:

- Héctor Murguía Lardizábal (1953–2024), Mexican politician
- Isabel Lardizábal (born 1968), Honduran swimmer
- María Lardizábal (born 1968), Honduran swimmer

== See also ==
- Tepetitla de Lardizabal
