= Ybarra =

Ybarra is a surname of Basque origin, and may refer to:

- Dustin Ybarra, American stand-up comedian and actor
- Javier Ybarra Bergé, Basque industrialist, writer, and politician
- Joe Ybarra, American video game producer
- Mike Ybarra, American video game industry executive
- Rocío Ybarra, Spanish hockey player
- Sam Ybarra, American soldier

== See also ==
- Ibarra
- Ybarra v. Illinois, a U.S. Supreme Court decision that established guidelines on if and when law enforcement can search unnamed parties as part of a search warrant.
- Ybarra v. Spangard, a leading legal decision in California discussing the exclusive control element of res ipsa loquitur.
