= Zubiri =

Zubiri may refer to

Surname

- Audrey Zubiri (born 1982), Filipino politician and columnist
- Ben Zubiri (1911–1969), Filipino composer, actor, and media personality
- Claudio Sillero-Zubiri, British zoologist
- Diana Zubiri (born 1985), Filipina actress
- Jose Maria Zubiri Jr. (born 1940), Filipino politician and businessman
- Jose Zubiri III (born 1963), Filipino politician
- Migz Zubiri (born 1969), Filipino politician
- Serafín Zubiri (born 1964), Spanish singer, composer and piano player
- Xavier Zubiri (1898–1983), Spanish philosopher

Others

- Zubiri, Navarre, a community in Navarra, Spain
- Pimentel vs. Zubiri electoral protest, 2007 election protest in Philippines
