= Hernán Bedoya =

Colombian land rights activist

- Died: December 8, 2017; Chocó Department
- Citizenship: Colombia

Hernán Bedoya was a Colombian land rights activist who fought corporate farmland encroachment. He was shot dead on December 8, 2017, in Chocó Department.

== Personal life ==
Bedoya grew up in the region of Chocó, Colombia. He lived on his family farm for 11 years, growing rice, corn, and bananas. In 1996, Colombian paramilitary forces evicted his family from the farm. He returned to his land in 2008, where he was evicted again. He was almost evicted a third time in 2012, as his house was demolished twice, but the presence of the team from NGO Justice and Peace prevented their removal.

== Activism ==
After nearly being evicted from his property three times, Bedoya converted his own land into the “Mi Tierra Biodiversity Zone”, in an effort to protect the farmland that belonged to the Afro-Colombian community in Chocó from encroaching agro-industry corporations. “Mi Tierra” was also founded for maintaining the rich biodiversity in the region. His calls for change were not limited to land rights, however; Bedoya was a member of Communities Building Peace in the Territories (CONPAZ) and worked to follow the 2016 peace agreement between FARC and the Colombian government. His anti-agribusiness activism resulted in numerous death threats from paramilitary groups with ties to the industry for over two years up until his assassination.

== Death ==
Bedoya was assassinated on December 8, 2017. He was shot 14 times by the Gaitanista Self Defense Force in Chocó between the point known as El Acopio and the hamlet of Playa Roja. His assassination came after 2 years of threats against him and numerous other protestors from members of the paramilitary force identified by aliases “Coyote”, “Yeison”, and “Lute”. Despite being under the official protection of the National Protection unit, Bedoya was given only a cell phone and a bulletproof vest to defend himself. His death devastated the population of the region, which had been celebrating 20 years of resistance to land encroachment from palm oil companies.

On August 18, 2018, Bedoya's tombstone was found to have been burned, presumably in retaliation for the continued activism of his family.

== Legacy ==
Bedoya is survived by his wife and children, all of whom are committed to continuing his work. His 18-year-old son, Ramón Bedoya, plans to become a rights activist and continue to protest the deforestation and corporate seizure of the region.
