= Nekane Aramburu =

Spanish art historian

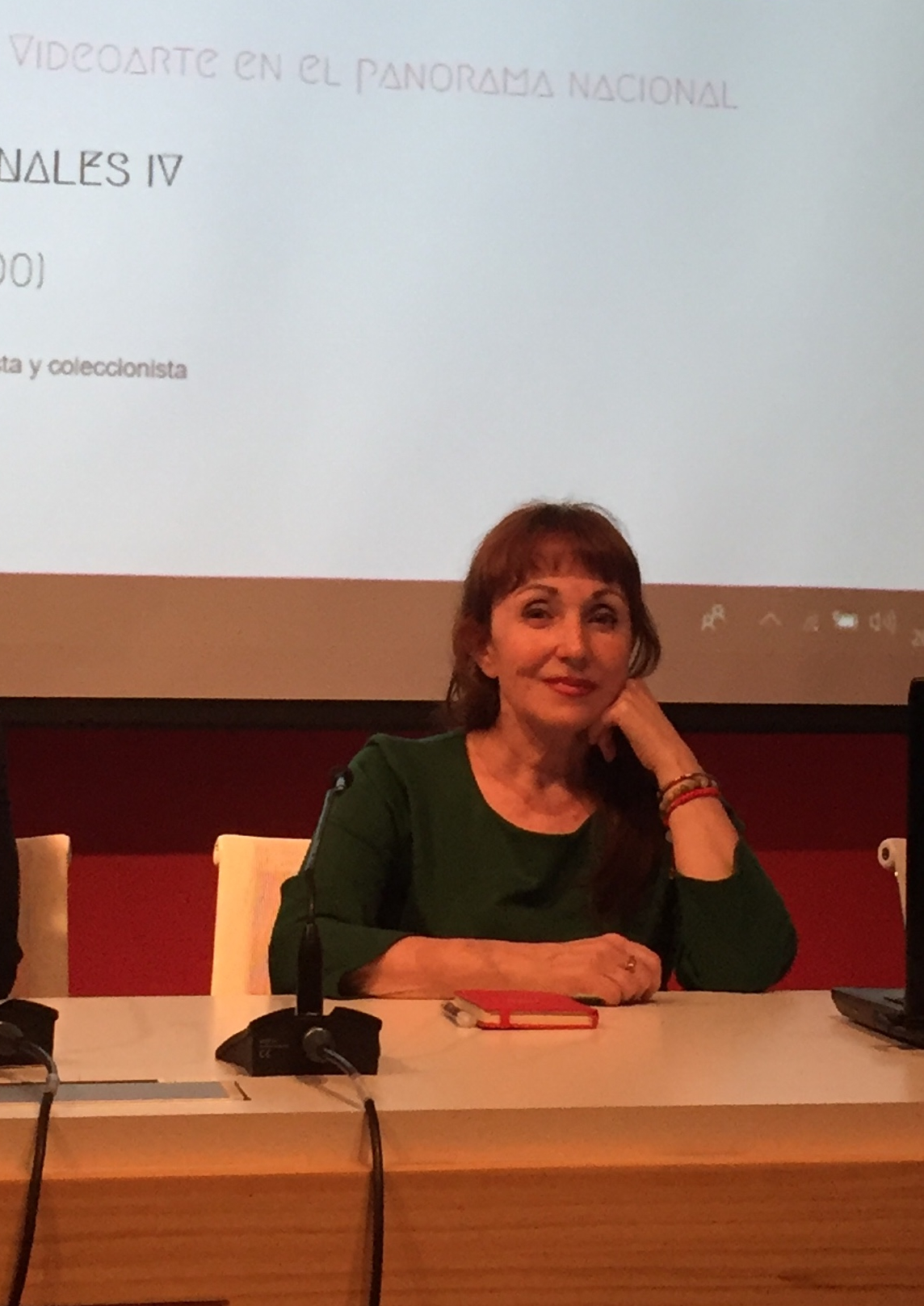
- Aramburu in 2019
- Born: 1965 (age 60–61); San Sebastián, Spain
- Citizenship: Spain
- Awards: Mujeres en las Artes Visuales, MAV

Academic background
- Education: Master's in art history

Academic work
- Discipline: Art history
- Institutions: Museum director
- Main interests: Art and technology

Nekane Aramburu (born 1965) is a Spanish art historian. She has worked as a cultural manager, museologist and curator since the 1990s. She was selected by competition as director of the Es Baluard museum (Palma de Mallorca Island) in February 2013, following the recommendations of the Code of Good Practice in Museums and Art Centers in Spain, a position she held for six years. Since that date Es Baluard has been an organic and dynamic museum; its collections, activities and educational models were rearranged giving rise to an active cultural complex.

== Biography ==
Nekane Aramburu was born on San Sebastián in 1965. She is a master in Museology in the University of the Basque Country. She works as a projects' director in contemporary art, art centers, and museums, to develop dynamic strategies and new models of education/mediation.

Her career includes: the direction of the Es Baluard Museum (2013–2019), direction of Espacio Ciudad. Centro de Arquitectura y Urbanismo (1999–2010) and director of Trasforma (1993–2003). Her work began in the Museum Network of the Provincial Council of Alava, among whose functions was the cataloguing and documentation of the initial collection of Artium, Basque Center-Museum of Contemporary Art (1989–2002), the museographic renovation of provincial museums or the activation of the Salado de Añana Valley. She has also collaborated intensively with institutions such as Agencia Española de Cooperación Internacional para el Desarrollo (AECID), the Cervantes Institute, the Kutxa Foundation in San Sebastián (2009–2011), the La Caixa Foundation of Barcelona (1991–1992) and the Klemm Foundation in Argentina (2019).

In 1993, she founded TRASFORMA, developing museum, ethnographic, historical, environmental and industrial architecture projects, in parallel to a program on emerging practices and new technologies. As director of Espacio Ciudad, a cultural entity of the City Council of Vitoria (Alava), she launched a pioneering program of exhibitions and publications on the relationship between the urban, architecture, contemporary thought and transdisciplinary practices.

She has carried out extensive research in the academic field and from the independent and institutional essay as in the case of "Archivos colectivos: History and actual situation in the independent spaces and artist collectives in Spain 1980-2010" (with the support of the Spanish Ministry of Culture) and from her experience as promoter of the network of spaces and collectives Red Arte (1994-2000). She has carried out specific projects on independent management, creating the first national network of autonomous entities in 1994 -Red Arte- and working on these practices especially in Latin America and Southern Europe/Maghreb. Martin Manen interviewed her in order to present "Collective Archives". This interview is headed by this sentence: "The excessive politicization of culture and the lack of critical spirit cloud everything". Also through Mujeres Santas she develops an extensive study in Latin America on post colonialism applying new practices of analysis and mediation that delve into issues of gender and environmental and social responsibility or in the French Grand East with Matériaux Inmateriel on the mechanisms of environmental responsibility in the collections and management of the FRAC of Champagne-Ardenne/Reims, Lorraine/Metz and Alsace/Strasbourg.)

She has conceived and directed Mediation and Education platforms, for general and specific audiences, such as Digital Generation at the Montehermoso Cultural Center in Vitoria, Spain(2003-2007) or Les Clíniques d'Es Baluard (2013-2018), a stable program of non-formal education for artists. She teaches curators, managers and artists in various university master's degrees as well as specialized workshops in Medellín (2008) and Bogotá (2012) Colombia, Montevideo, Uruguay (2009), Lima, Peru (2011), Bahía Blanca and Buenos Aires in Argentina (2011), and Havana, Cuba.

She has been a juror and advisor to different national and international institutions and committees: Basque Government. Basque Council of Culture (2010–2014), Fundación de los Museos. Quito. Mariano Aguilera Award (2012), Ministry of Culture. Velázquez Award (2014), Ramon Llull Institute. Venice Biennale (2016) or Diputación de Valencia among others.

Since 2007, she has been a member of different professional boards of directors: ICOM, MAV (Mujeres artes visuales), IAC (Instituto de Arte Contemporáneo) and currently of ADACE (Asociación de directores y directores de museos y centros de Arte de España), being also a member of CIMAN (International Committee for Museums and Collections of Modern Art).

== Selection of curated exhibitions ==
Fragile. CCE/Montevideo (2009), Caras B del videoarte español (with Carlos T. Mori) in Bangkok / Seoul / Sydney / Prague / Berlin (2010 and 2013), Palabras corrientes (with Marisa González) Instituto Cervantes. New York / Beijing (2006), Todo cuanto amé formaba parte de tí, Damascus / Dublin / Brussels (2007-2010), Bluesky. Fundación Telefónica de Buenos Aires (2009), Absolute Beginners. Sala Amárica, Vitoria (2009), Noveles. XLIII and XLIV. Koldo Mitxelena. San Sebastián (2009 and 2011), Epilogue. PhotoEspaña/Cervantes Institute. Madrid (2010), Ultramar. Kubo Kutxa. San Sebastián (2011), Cosmic Ray. La Chaufferie/ESADS. Strasbourg (2012), La Rabia fundadora. Lima-Peru (2012), Troubled Waters-Eaux Agitées. Aquarium. San Sebastián( 2011 to 2019), Gaur(sic) (London / Managua / Costa Rica / Honduras / Córdoba-Argentina / Montevideo / Mexico / Santiago de Chile, Albi-France. AECID-Etxepare (2011-2015), Archipel Ouest. Îles du futur en FRAC/Corse / MAN. Museum of art of Nuoro. (2019 y 2020)

Committed to environmental/sustainability and gender policies, in 2018 MAV's Miradas de Mujeres Biennial interviews Aramburu and among the multiple statements she emphasizes on gender inequality in institutions "Everything that is done real and effective for the visibilization of women is important. There is no truce anymore."

Her research as a theoretical essayist has been published in different media, sharing knowledge in different Universities, Masters and specialized courses.

== Acknowledgments ==
In 2013, she was awarded the MAV Award by the Association of Women in the Visual Arts, manager category.

== Publications ==
Books and monographs as author and/or editor (selection in Spanish)

- Alternativas. Políticas de lo independiente en las artes visuales Edita: Cendeac (2020)ISBN 978-84-15556-82-4
- The echo images. Isaki Lacuesta. Edited by: Ajuntament de Girona (2019)ISBN 978-84-8496-267-0
- Annelise Witt. Poesía del fang (2019)ISBN 978-84-09-10044-6
- D'anada i tornada. Es Baluard (2019)ISBN 9788494840944
- Ciutat de vacances. Es Baluard/Consorci Museus/Arts Santa Mónica (2019)ISBN 978-84-482-6305-8-ISBN 978-84-948409-6-8
- Colección Es Baluard. Catálogo razonado (2019) ISBN 978-84-8496-267-0
- Robert Cahen. Paisatges Edita: Es Baluard (2019) ISBN 978-84-948409-2-0
- Ells i Nosaltres Es Baluard (2019) ISBN 978-84-948409-7-5
- Ereccions. Ayuntament de Palma (2019) ISBN 9788495267825
- Mujeres Dadá/ Dones Dada. (2019) ISBN 978-84-948409-1-3
- Marina Nuñez. Phantasmas. Reproductibilitat 2.3. (2018) ISBN 978-84-939388-8-8
- Reproductibilitat 1.0.ISBN 978-84-939388-4-0
- Reproductibilidad 2.2. Colección Olorvisual. (2016) ISBN 978-84-945425-6-5
