= Amenábar =

Amenábar is a Basque-language surname. Notable people with the surname include:

- Alejandro Amenábar (born 1972), Spanish-Chilean film director, screenwriter, and composer
- Cecilia Amenábar (born 1971), Chilean model and actress
