= Echenique =

Echenique is a surname of Basque origin. Echenique, (spelled Etxenike in standard Basque means "close to the house". Other spelling variants are Echeñique and Etchenique. Notable people with the surname include:

== Sport ==
- Karla Echenique, Dominican volleyball player
- José Echenique, Venezuelan basketball player
- Rafael Echenique, Argentine golfer

== Music ==
- Cecilia Echenique, Chilean singer-songwriter
- Benjamín Juárez Echenique, Mexican popular musical conductor
- José Miguel "Negro" Piñera Echenique, Chilean musician

== Politics ==
- Gertrudis Echenique, Chilean First Lady between 1896 and 1901. Wife of Federico Errázuriz Echaurren
- José Rufino Echenique, Peruvian politician. President of Peru from 1851 until 1855
- Pablo Echenique Robba, Spanish scientist and politician
- Sebastián Piñera Echenique, Chilean politician, member of the National Renewal (RN)
- José Piñera Echenique, Chilean economist

== Science ==
- Pedro Miguel Echenique, Spanish theoretical physicist and from 1980 to 1984 minister of education in the Basque Country

== Literature ==
- Alfredo Bryce Echenique, a Peruvian writer
