= Silvana Ibarra =

Ecuadorian singer, actress, and politician

Deputy of the National Congress of Ecuador
- In office 2003–2007
- Constituency: Guayas Province

Personal details
- Born: Silvana Marjorie Ibarra Castillo; 1959 (age 65–66); Bucay, Ecuador
- Political party: Ecuadorian Roldosist Party
- Spouse: Gustavo Pacheco (1990–2019)
- Children: Ámar Pacheco
- Occupation: Singer, actress

Silvana Marjorie Ibarra Castillo (born 1959) is an Ecuadorian singer, actress, and politician.

== Biography ==
Silvana Ibarra was born in Bucay in 1959. She began singing as a child, making her first radio appearance at age 5, and recording her first single at 15.

She has appeared in several television series, beginning with the telenovela Una mujer in 1991.

Her 2014 album, Silvana entre cuerdas was produced by her husband, musician Gustavo Pacheco, and contains covers of 12 boleros. Her 2019 album Silvana de bohemia pays tribute to musicians of the 1960s and 70s, such as Julio Jaramillo and Olimpo Cárdenas.

Ibarra and Pacheco were married in 1990. They had one daughter together, sculptor Ámar Pacheco, who won the Queen of Guayaquil talent competition in 2015. President Abdalá Bucaram and Lorena Gallo (formerly Bobbitt, whom Ibarra would portray in an episode of the TV series De la Vida Real) acted as Ámar's godparents at her baptism in October 1996. Ibarra also has two children from a previous relationship. She and Gustavo Pacheco divorced in 2019.

== Politics ==
In the 2002 legislative elections, Ibarra won a seat in the National Congress representing Guayas Province for the Ecuadorian Roldosist Party. During her term she presented eight reform bills.

== Discography ==
- Silvana ...en cuerpo y alma (1989)
- Silvana andicumbias (1990)
- Silvana entre cuerdas (2014)
- Silvana de bohemia (2019)

== Television series ==
- Una mujer (1991)
- De la Vida Real (2000; one episode, in the role of Lorena Bobbitt)
- Cholicienta (2007)
- Mujeres asesinas: chapter "Cándida, esposa improvisada" (2009)
