= Arauz =

Arauz or Araúz is a surname of Basque origin. Notable persons with that name include:

- Blanca Aráuz (1909–1933), first National Heroine of Nicaragua
- Félix Aráuz (1935–2024), Ecuadorian painter
- Hansell Arauz (born 1989), Costa Rican football player
- Gardenia Arauz (born 1972), Bolivian politician
- Jonathan Araúz (born 1998), Panamanian professional baseball player
- José María Araúz de Robles Estremera (1898–1977), Spanish politician, businessman and bull breeder
- Marcelo Araúz Lavadenz (born 1934), Bolivian festival director, culture promoter, choir leader, and music educator
- Oscar Araúz (born 1980), Bolivian football player
- Randall Arauz, Costa Rican environmentalist specialist in shark conservation
- Reina Torres de Araúz (1932–1982), Panamanian anthropologist, ethnographer and professor
- Vanessa Arauz (born 1989), Ecuadorian football manager

== See also ==
- Arauz Formation, a fossiliferous stratigraphic unit in Spain
