= Goizueta =

Goizueta may refer to:

- Goizueta, Navarre, Spanish municipality
- Goizueta Business School, Atlanta, Georgia
- People:
  - Roberto Goizueta (1931–1997), Cuban-American engineer, manager, and philanthropist
  - Roberto S. Goizueta (b. 1954), American theologian
