= Carlos García-Bedoya Zapata =

Peruvian diplomat

Carlos García-Bedoya Zapata (November 7, 1925 in Lima – October 2, 1980 in Lima) was a Peruvian diplomat.

He was Peruvian Ambassador in the United States from 1976 until 1979 and the foreign minister of Peru in 1979.

== Works ==
- “Política Exterior Peruana. Teoría y Práctica”

== See also ==
- Andean Community

Preceded by José de la Puente	Peruvian Minister of Foreign Affairs; 1979	Succeeded by Arturo García García
