= Arantza =

Settlement in Navarre, Spain

Coordinates: 43.196°N 1.725°W

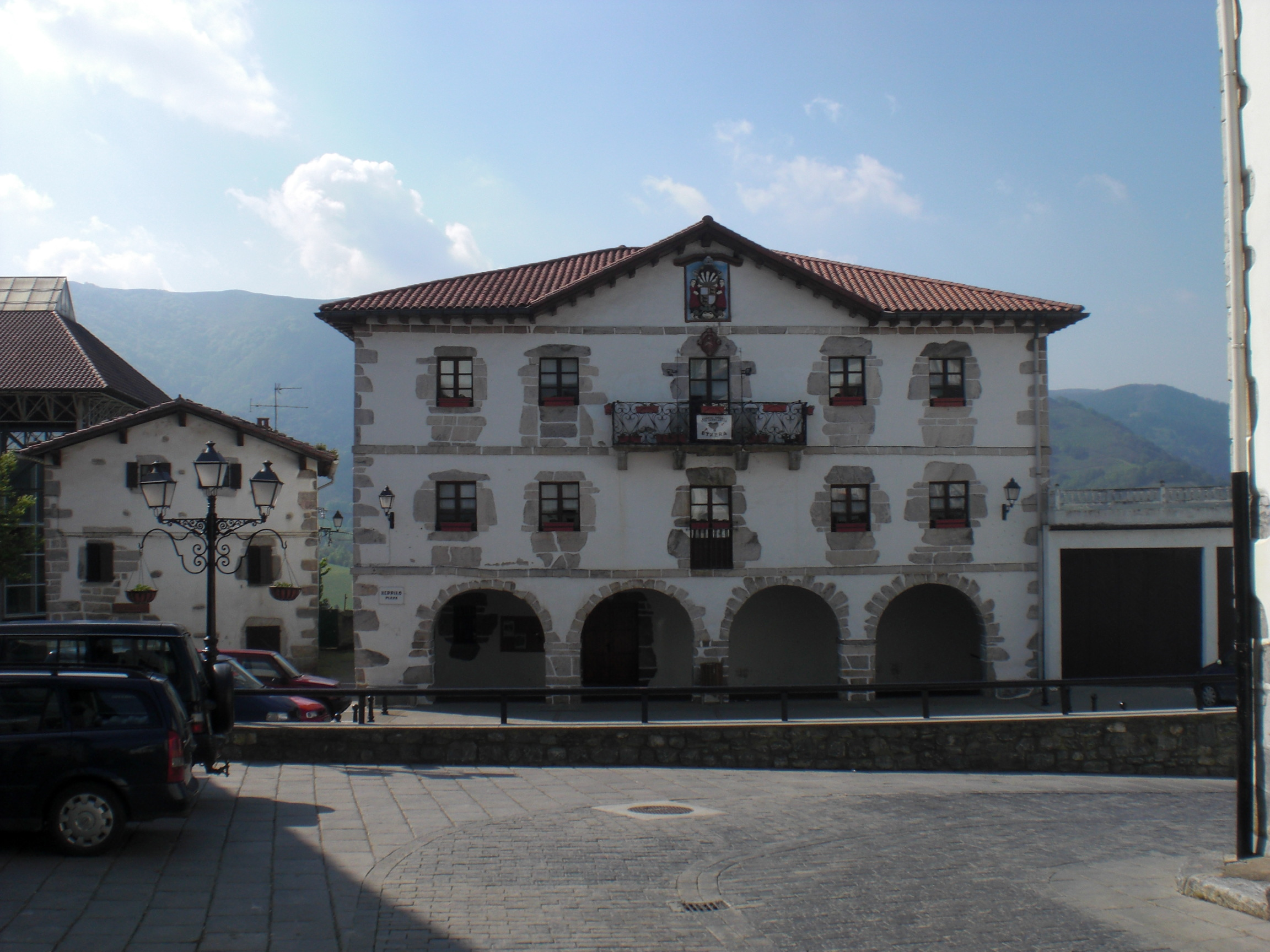

Arantza's coat of arms

Arantza is a town and municipality located in the province and autonomous community of Navarre, northern Spain.
