= Juan Loyola =

Venezuelan sculptor

Juan Alberto Loyola Valbuena (April 9, 1952 – April 27, 1999) was a Venezuelan sculptor.

== Biography ==
Loyola was born in Caracas, Venezuela on April 9, 1952, the son of Juan Luis Mario Loyola and Auristela Valbuena. He is considered to be one of the most controversial artists and multitalented people of Venezuela. He was also a poet, performer, photographer, film-maker, and painter. He died suddenly on April 27, 1999, in Catia la Mar, Venezuela, after a long battle with cardiomegaly.
