= Ezkurra =

- Municipality
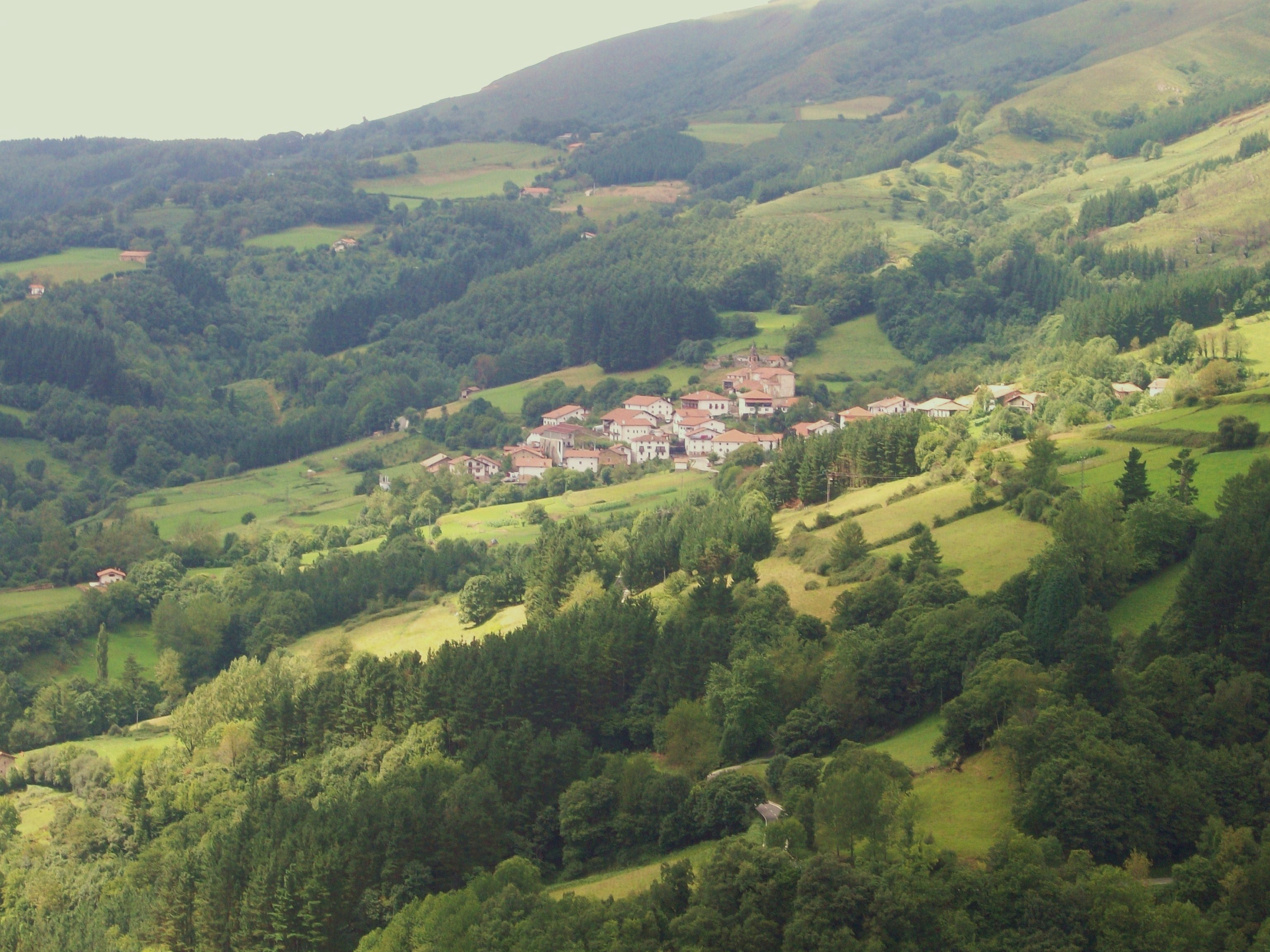

- Coat of arms

- Location of Ezkurra within Navarre Location of Ezkurra within Spain
- Coordinates: 43°05′05″N 1°51′44″W
- Country: Spain
- Autonomous community: Navarre
- Province: Navarre
- Comarca: Malerreka

Government
  - Mayor: Julián Gogorza Jauregui

Area
  - Total: 24 km^{2} (9.3 sq mi)
- Elevation: 525 m (1,722 ft)

Population (2025-01-01)
  - Total: 125
  - Density: 5.2/km^{2} (13/sq mi)
- Time zone: UTC+1 (CET)
  - Summer (DST): UTC+2 (CEST)
- Postal code: 31749

Ezkurra is a town and municipality located in the province and autonomous community of Navarre, northern Spain. The town's name is from the Basque language of the locals.
