= Garai (surname) =

Garai is a surname of multiple origins. Garai is a Basque surname that appeared in Sopuerta (Vizcaya), that means "peak" or "height". Garai is also common Bengali and Hungarian surname.

== List ==
Notable people with this surname include:

- Aritz López Garai (born 1980), Spanish footballer
- Dorothy Garai (died 1438), Hungarian noblewoman who became Queen of Bosnia
- Fernando Lamikiz Garai, a Basque lawyer
- Ladislaus Garai (c. 1410–1459), Palatine of Hungary
- Laszlo Garai, a Hungarian economist and academic
- Nicholas I Garai (c. 1325–1386), Palatine of Hungary
- Nicholas II Garai (1367–1433), Palatine of Hungary
- Romola Garai (born 1982), English actress

== See also ==
- The House of Garai
- Garay (surname)
