= Iturbide (surname) =

Iturbide is a Basque surname, original from the region of Navarra, a province located north of Spain, bordering with France. It is Basque for "Road of the fountain". Notable people with the surname include:

- Pedro Antonio de Iturbide y Pérez, (1731–?). Spanish military and politician who lived in Mexico.
- Agustín de Iturbide, (1783–1824). Military and first Emperor of Mexico. He started fighting the independents with the Spanish Royal Army, later consumed the Mexican independence from Spain and was Mexico's First Emperor.
- Sabás Iturbide y Mexía, (1812–1875). Mexican lawyer and politician. He was governor of the State of Mexico and had a very close friendship with Mexican politician Melchor Ocampo. He was shot and executed in Mexico City in 1875.
- Luis Iturbide y Mexía, (1817–1898). Mexican doctor, businessman and politician. He was State Advisor to the Mexican government during the French Intervention in Mexico, and was leader of the Liberal Party in the state of Michoacán.
- Graciela Iturbide (born 1942). Mexican photographer, widely published and collected. Recipient of the Hasselblad Award in 2008.
- José Andrés Iturbide y Mexía, (1826–1858). Mexican military. He was Colonel of the Liberal Mexican Army during the Reform War He is considered a hero of the Ayutla Revolution. The town of Aguililla, Michoacán was renamed Iturbide to honor him.
- Agustín de Iturbide y Green, (1863–1925). Grandson of Agustín de Iturbide and adopted son of Mexican emperor Maximilian of Habsburg.
- Edmundo Iturbide Reygondaud, (1900–1974). Mexican Catholic priest. Founder of the congregation of the Brothers of Mercy of Jesus Priest, a Catholic order with pontificial rights.
- Miguel Estrada Iturbide, (1908–1997). Mexican lawyer and politician. Founder of the Mexican political party PAN National Action Party, along with Manuel Gómez Morín, Manuel Ulloa and Juan José Páramo Castro. Member of the Mexican parliament in 1964.
- María José Iturbide, a Guatemalan politician serving as Guatemala's Minister of Environment.
