= Zelaya (surname) =

Zelaya or Celaya is a Basque surname. Both are variant spellings of Zelaia, a habitational name in Biscay province, Basque Country, from the Basque language zelai ('field' or 'meadow') and the definite article -a.

Notable people with the surname include:

- Carlos Zelaya, a graffiti artist who contributed to the video game Skitchin'
- Emilio José Zelaya (born 1987), Argentine football forward
- Francisco Zelaya y Ayes (1798–1848), President of Honduras
- Héctor Ramón Zelaya (Rivera) (born 1958), Honduran football player
- José Santos Zelaya, president of Nicaragua 1893–1909
- Juan Nepomuceno Fernández Lindo y Zelaya (1790–1857), New Spain lawyer and politician, president of Honduras 1847–1852
- Luis Selvin Zelaya Bran (born 1979), Salvadoran professional soccer player
- Manuel Antonio Alberto Zelaya (born 1958), Honduran politician
- Manuel Zelaya, former president (2006–2009) of Honduras
- Nelson Fabián Zelaya (born 1973), Paraguayan football defender
- Raquel Zelaya (born 1945), Guatemalan economist and politician
- Rodolfo Antonio Zelaya (García) (born 1988), Salvadoran footballer
- Xiomara Castro de Zelaya, the 56th President and first female President of Honduras
