= House of Lecubarri =

The House of Lecubarri (Spanish: Casa de Lecubarri; Spanish pronunciation: [lekuˈβari]) was an ancient noble family. The etymology of the name comes from the words lek(h)u (place) and barri (new), meaning "new place" in the Basque language of the north of Spain. The House has transmitted its status of nobility since time immemorial.

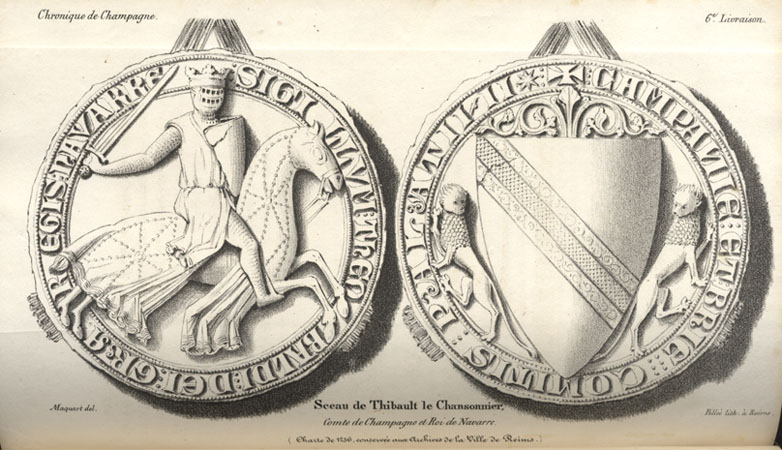
Personal stamp of Theobald I of Navarre, of which they were Mayordomos mayores, c. 1234

== History ==
The origins of the family trace back to the 11th century (Late Middle Ages), when more than half of the Iberian Peninsula was under the rule of the Moors. The lineage gained influence in the court of the king Theobald I, son of Blanche of Navarre and nephew of Sancho VII, where it took part in his foreign issues and private security from 1234.

== See also ==
- Duchy of Gascony

== Bibliography ==
- García Carraffa, Alberto & Arturo (1966). El solar vasco navarro. Vol. IV. San Sebastián: Librería Internacional.
- de Querexeta, Jaime (1970). Diccionario onomástico y heráldico vasco. Vol. III. Bilbao: La gran enciclopedia vasca. ISBN 84-248-0521-6.
