= Alcorta =

- Town
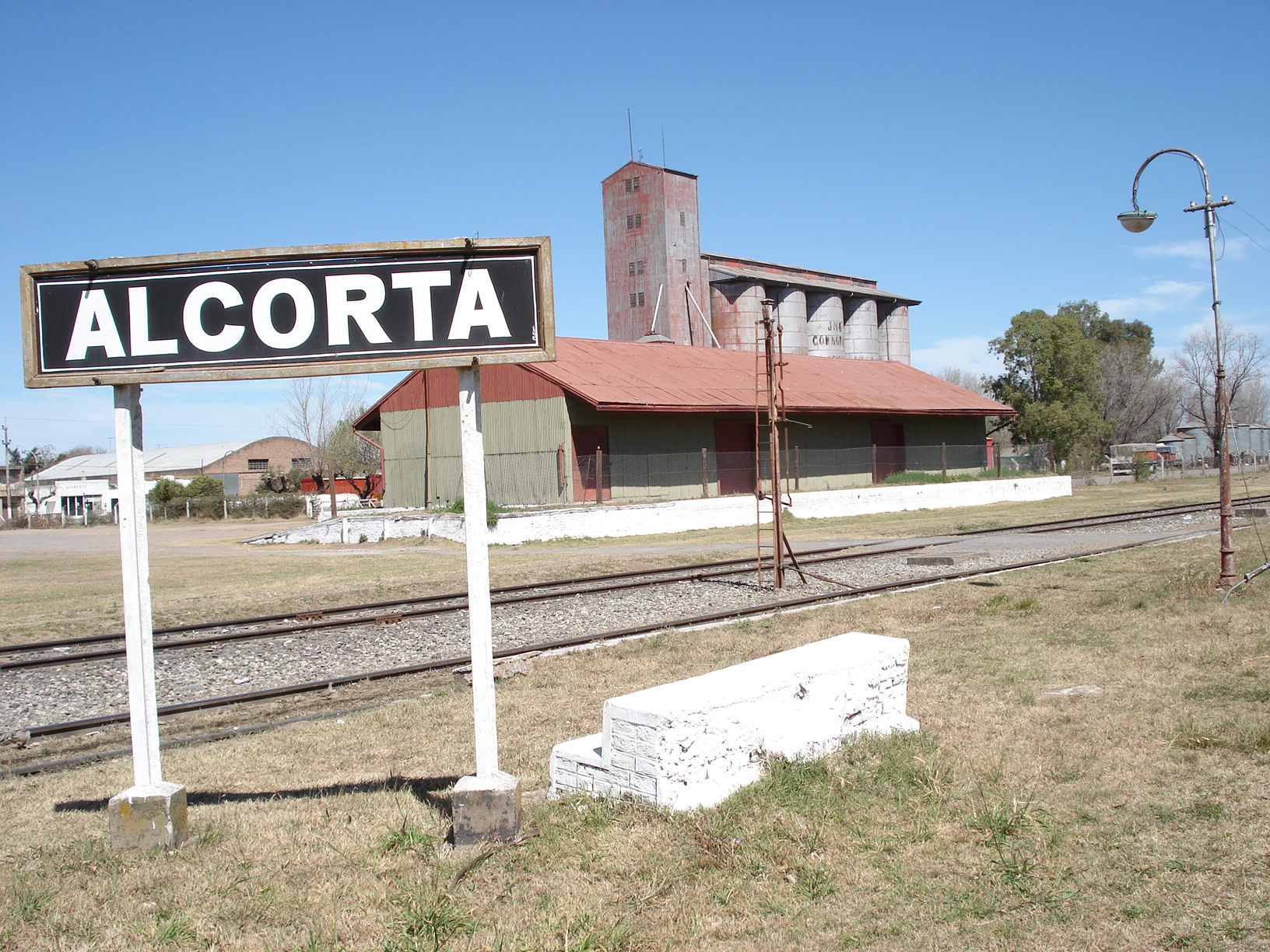
- Alcorta train station

- Location of Alcorta in Argentina
- Coordinates: 33°32′S 61°7′W
- Country: Argentina
- Province: Santa Fe
- Department: Constitución

Population
  - Total: 9,870 0
- Time zone: UTC−3 (ART)
- CPA base: S2117
- Dialing code: +54 3465

Alcorta is a town (comuna) in the province of Santa Fe, Argentina. It has 7,450 inhabitants, according to the 2001 census [INDEC] census, and lies in the south of the province, on National Route 178, 80 km (50 mi) south-southwest of Rosario and 255 km (158 mi) south of the provincial capital Santa Fe.

== History ==
A rail station in what would become the town was built in 1889 to serve both passengers and freight traffic. Alcorta was founded in 1892 by Juan Bernardo Iturraspe. It is best known as the starting point of the first large-scale agrarian strike in the history of Argentina, called the Grito de Alcorta, which began on 25 June 1912 and subsequently gave rise to the foundation of the Argentine Agrarian Federation.

Union leader José Ignacio Rucci was born in Alcorta.
