= Ibarra (surname) =

Ibarra is a Basque-language surname meaning "valley" or "plain by the river". Notable people with the surname include:

- Abelardo Colome Ibarra, Cuban vice president of the State Council
- Adolfo Tapia Ibarra, Mexican professional wrestler better known as La Parka and L.A. Park
- Angel Ibarra, guitarist for the band Aiden
- Aníbal Ibarra, Argentine politician
- Ascensión Esquivel Ibarra, former President of Costa Rica
- Aylin Ibarra (born 2002), Mexican rower
- Benny Ibarra, Mexican singer and actor
- David Ibarra Muñoz, Mexican economist
- Dulce Soledad Ibarra (born 1992), American artist, curator, educator
- Elio Ibarra, Argentine boxer
- Eliza Ibarra, American porn actress
- Eloísa Ibarra (born 1968), Uruguayan artist
- Eréndira Ibarra, Mexican actress
- Eustacio Jiménez Ibarra, Mexican professional wrestler better known as El Hijo de Cien Caras
- Gabriel Mendoza Ibarra, Chilean footballer
- Hugo Benjamín Ibarra, Argentine football (soccer) player
- José María Velasco Ibarra, former President of Ecuador
- Joaquín Ibarra (1725–1785), Spanish printer.
- Juan Carlos Rodríguez Ibarra, Spanish politician
- JM Ibarra (born 2000), Filipino actor
- Manuel Ibarra, Chilean footballer
- Miguel Ibarra (soccer, born 1990), American footballer
- Pedro de Ibarra (governor of La Florida)
- Ramón Ibarra Banda, Mexican professional wrestler better known as Super Parka
- Ramón Ibarra Rivera, Mexican professional wrestler better known as Volador Jr.
- Renato Ibarra, Ecuadorian professional footballer
- Rosa Maria Ibarra, Spanish politician
- Salomón Ibarra Mayorga, Nicaraguan poet, political thinker, and the lyricist who wrote the Nicaraguan National Anthem
- Silvana Ibarra (born 1959), Ecuadorian singer, actress, and politician
- Susie Ibarra, American percussionist
- Vilma Ibarra, Argentine politician and sister of Aníbal
