= Federación Agraria Argentina =

The logo of the Argentine Agrarian Federation

The Argentine Agrarian Federation (in Spanish, Federación Agraria Argentina, FAA) is a private institution that serves as a business organization for small and medium agricultural owners of means of production (land, farms, etc.) or rural entrepreneurs in Argentina. It was founded on 15 August 1912 after the first employers' strike of agrarian farmers demanding protection from the exploitation of big landowners. The strikers gathered in Alcorta, in the south of the province of Santa Fe.

The FAA divides the country in 14 districts. The institution is ruled by a body of directors (the Central Directive Council) proposed by the districts and others, elected during an Ordinary Annual Congress. Its current seat is located in Rosario.
