= John Saldivar (fashion designer) =

Mexican-born fashion designer (born 1979)

- Born: March 20, 1979 (age 47); Monterrey, Mexico
- Label: John Saldivar

John Saldivar is a Mexican-American fashion designer originally from Monterrey, Mexico.

== Collection ==
John Saldivar began his fashion career in 2001 while apprenticing with Oscar de la Renta and his design team. Through de la Renta, Saldivar met American editor André Leon Talley, who later hired him as his personal assistant at Vogue Magazine.

Before launching his self-titled collection for Autumn/Winter 2007, Saldivat worked with designers including Catherine Malandrino and Lucien Pellat-Finet as director of public relations.

He currently resides in New York City and works out of his Chelsea design studio.

Saldivar's work has attracted some attention in the fashion press. His clothing has been requested by stylists for possible wear by celebrities such as Scarlett Johansson, Sarah Jessica Parker and Kristin Davis.
