= Zaldívar =

Zaldívar (originally Basque Zaldibar) is a Spanish family name of Basque origin. Zaldi, meaning "horse" and Ibar, meaning valley. Zaldivar, means "valley of horses".

People with this surname include:

- Adolfo Zaldívar (1943–2013), Chilean politician
- Ambrosio Zaldívar, Cuban Paralympic
- Andrés Zaldívar, Chilean politician
- Ángel Zaldívar, Mexican football player
- Juan Carlos Zaldívar, filmmaker, video artist
- Juan de Zaldívar (1514–1570), Spanish official and explorer
- Juan de Zaldivar (Spanish soldier), (c. 1570–1598), Spanish soldier
- Rafael Zaldívar (1834–1903), President of El Salvador
- Roberto Zaldívar, Argentine physician
- Vicente de Zaldivar (c. 1573-before 1650), Spanish soldier

Zaldívar may also refer to the Zaldívar mine, a copper mining operation in Chile's Atacama Desert
