= Unzaga =

Unzaga is a surname of Basque origins that may refer to

- Luis de Unzaga (1721–1790), Spanish Governor of Louisiana
- Jon Unzaga (born 1962), Spanish cyclist
- Óscar Únzaga (1916–1959), Bolivian political figure and rebel
- Ramón Unzaga (1894–1923), Spanish-Chilean football player
