= Sagardotegi =

Cider house found in the Basque Country

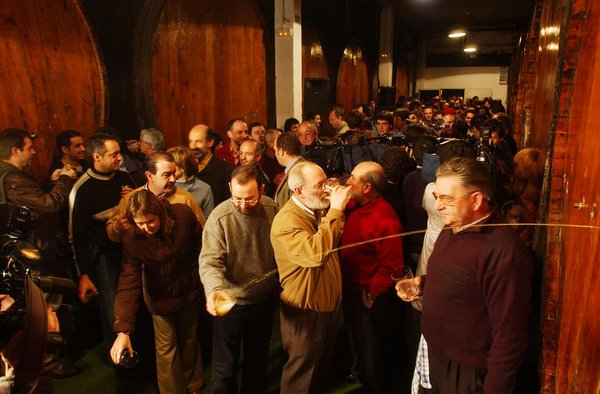
The txotx in a semi-traditional sagardotegi in San Sebastián, Basque Country

A sagardotegi (pronounced [s̺aɡaɾdoˈteɡi]) is a type of cider house found in the Basque Country where Basque cider and traditional foods such as cod omelettes are served. Modern sagardotegis can broadly be described as a cross between a steakhouse and a cider house.

Most Basque cider, like most cider varieties in Spain, is called "natural" because, unlike many other European varieties, it is still, instead of sparkling. It normally contains 4-6% alcohol and is served directly from the barrel in a sagardotegi.

== Etymology ==
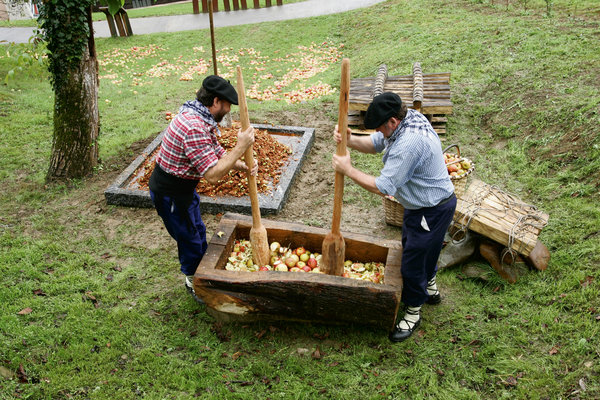
Pressing apples in a traditional way without a press using a wooden mallet called 'pisoi'

The word sagardotegi is composed of three elements: sagar "apple" and ardo "wine", yielding sagardo or "cider" and the suffix -tegi which denotes a building where an activity takes place. The word thus translates as "cider house". In some Northern Basque dialects cider is called sagarno or sagarano but that only reflects a different development of the Proto-Basque root *ardano "wine".

Although the word ardo today exclusively means "wine", the original meaning seems to have been "fermented drink". This is evidenced by the recorded form mahatsarno "wine"; mahats meaning "grape" so literally "fermented drink from grapes". Thus the original meaning of the related sagardo and garagardo "beer" must have been "fermented drink from apples" and "fermented drink from barley" (garagar "barley").

Collectively all Basque cider houses are referred to as sagardotegi but since the emergence of more restaurant-style sagardotegi, the traditional type where the grill and eating area are under the same roof as the press have been called dolare-sagardotegi/tolare-sagardotegi or "press-cider house".

In Spanish a sagardotegi is called sidrería; cidrerie or chai à cidre in French.

== Tradition ==
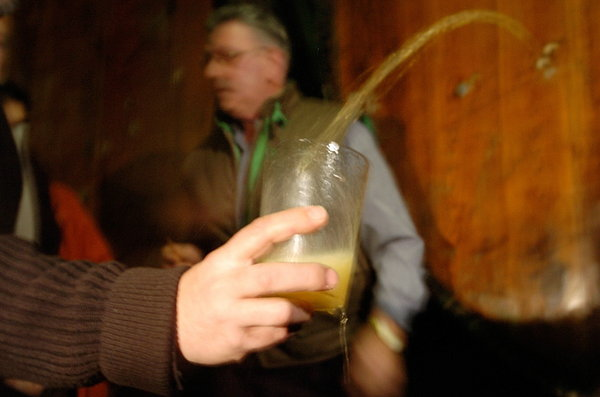
A txotx

The more recent traditions surrounding the sagardotegis hail back to the time when buyers interested in purchasing cider from a particular maker would bring along food for the tasting as it is considered best when taken with a meal. This soon evolved into gastronomical tradition with the sagardotegis becoming a cross between a grill and a cider house. In a traditional sagardotegi, three courses are taken:

- starter: a cod omelette or cod with peppers
- main: a steak
- dessert: cheese (often Idiazabal cheese), quince jelly and nuts

The steaks today are usually provided by the sagardotegi but in some places the tradition of bringing along your own steak is still practised. Food is traditionally taken standing at tall tables but modern establishments often provide seating.

In the most traditional sagardotegi, each guest, after having paid in the region of 25 euros, receives a glass and at various intervals a txotx (pronounced [tʃotʃ]) is called. At this, everyone who wishes for cider gets up and heads to the lower section of the sagardotegi where the barrels are located. The large barrels, which are stored horizontally, have a small tap in the lid at about head-height. This is opened by the innkeeper or the first guest to reach the barrel and a thin stream of cider exits, which the guests catch with their glasses as low down as possible to aerate the cider. People then return to their tables to continue with their meal and cider until the next txotx is called. Each guest may drink as much cider as they like.

As this can be a somewhat messy affair, the barrels are often located behind a partition and with a lower floor level than the main eating area.

After the maturation of last year's cider, the cider season opens, with aficionados sampling different houses.

== Geographical spread ==
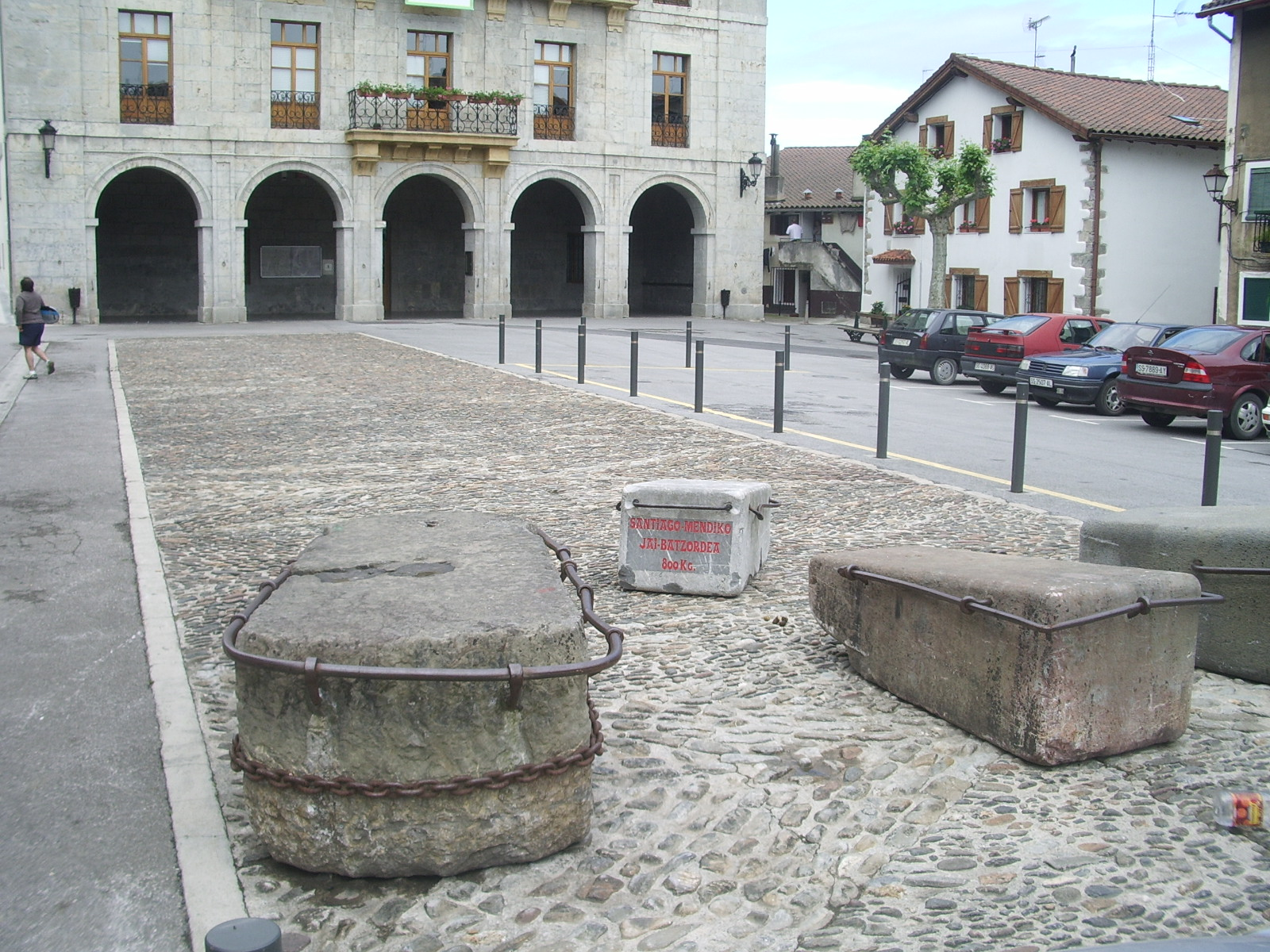
The main square of Astigarraga with the stones and track for the idi-probak

Most sagardotegi are located in the province of Gipuzkoa, in particular in the area around Hernani and Astigarraga but they can be found in all provinces of the Basque Country. Traditional tolare-sagardotegis are found in (towns with more than one are marked in bold):

- Álava: Amurrio, Aramaio
- Biscay: Ajangiz, Berriatua, Bilbao, Dima, Gatika, Guernica, Gizaburuaga, Iurreta, Lezama, Markina-Xemein, Mendexa, Mungia, Muxika, Zornotza
- Gipuzkoa: Abaltzisketa, **Aduna**, Aia, Altzaga, Amezketa, **Andoain**, Asteasu, **Astigarraga**, Ataun, Azpeitia, **San Sebastián**, Errenteria, **Hernani**, Hondarribia, Ikaztegieta, Irun, Deba, Lasarte-Oria, Leaburu, Legorreta, **Oiartzun**, Olaberria, Tolosa, **Urnieta**, **Usurbil**, Zerain, **Zubieta**
- Labourd: Biriatou, Urrugne
- Lower Navarre: Lasa
- Navarre: Aldatz, **Beruete**, Lekunberri, Lesaka, Pamplona, Lekarotz, Murugarren

The towns of Astigarraga (20+, population 4242 in 2006), Hernani (10+), Urnieta (5+), Oiartzun (5) and Usurbil (5) have the highest concentrations.

== Basque cider ==
=== Production ===
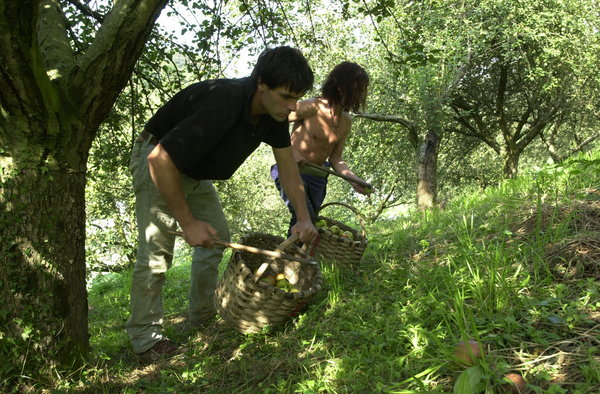
Collecting apples the traditional way

The archetypal sagardotegi in the 16th century would typically resemble a low, two storey farm-building with a tiled roof. The three main parts of such a sagardotegi were the pressing area, the storage area and the kitchen.

The intricate pressing machine was spread across both floor levels. It essentially consisted on a large cantilevered beam (dolare haga) which passed between the two central vertical support beams (dolare zutabeak) of the building. The fixed end was held in place by a wooden beam (dolare zutabeak) right beside the actual press. The far end of the beam sat around a tall wooden screw (ardatza) which ran between beams under the roof (gain hagak) and the ground floor of the building, ending in a capstan-like turning mechanism. At the bottom end of the screw hung a stone weight (pisu harria) which rotated in a hole in the ground. By turning the screw at the ground floor level, the horizontal beam on the first floor would gradually be pulled downwards and, along with the gravitational pull, exert pressure on the apple press at the far end. The apple press itself consisted essentially of a wooden base with a surrounding groove to catch the juices upon which the apple pomace is placed and a wooden platform which pressed down on the apples. Today, modern machinery is used to press the apples.

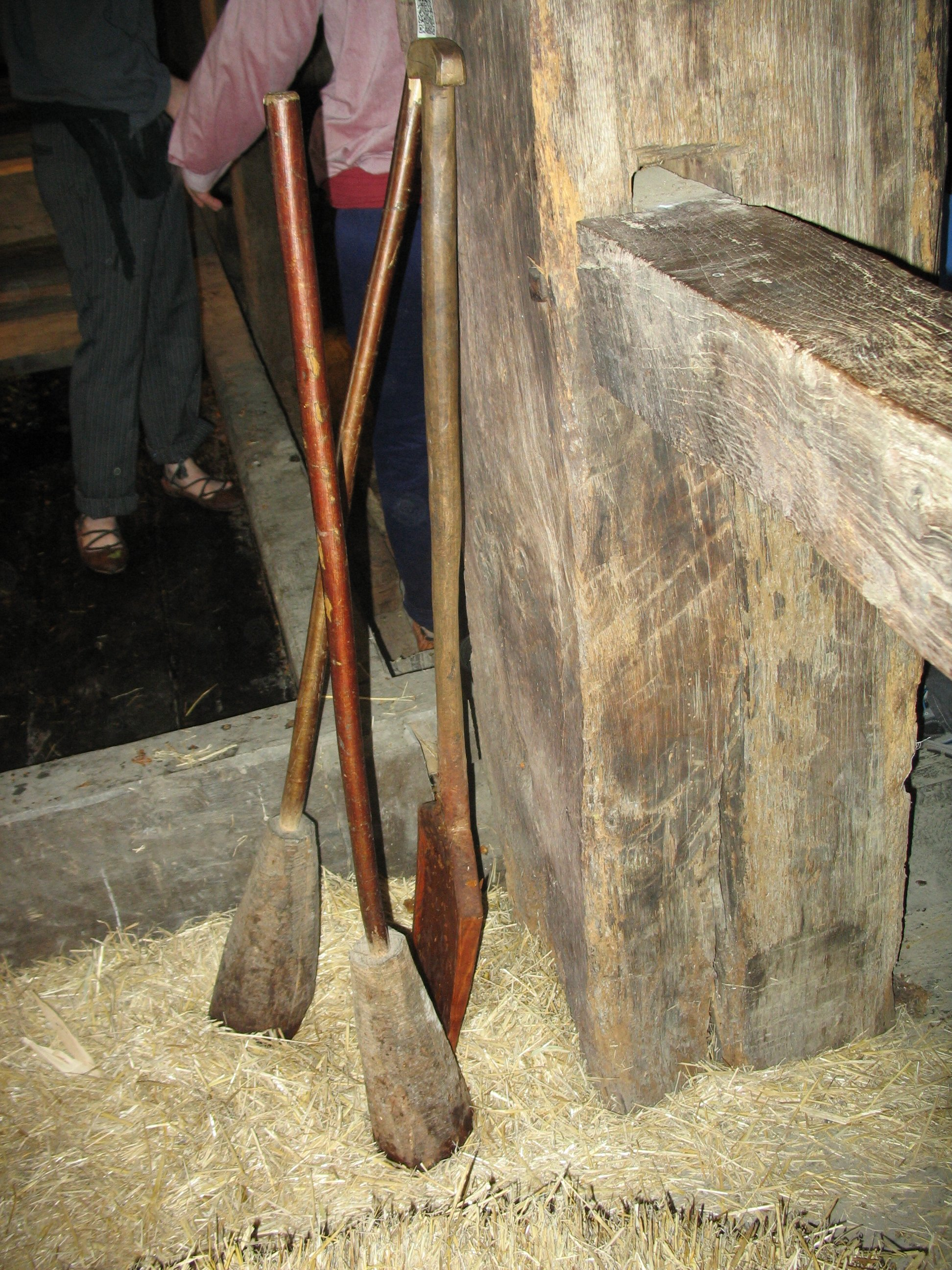
Pisoiak used for scratting apples

Apples are collected from the end of September onwards until the middle of November using the kizkia, a tool that resembles a stick with a nail in it. They are then scratted (crushed) into pomace in the matxaka using wooden mallets called pisoiak but without cracking the seeds as this would add a bitter taste. The pulp (patsa) is then transferred to a press and the must (muztioa) collected (or caught on the ground floor in a vat (tina) in the medieval style sagardotegi), processed and stored in barrels (usually oak or chestnut) in the storage area to mature.

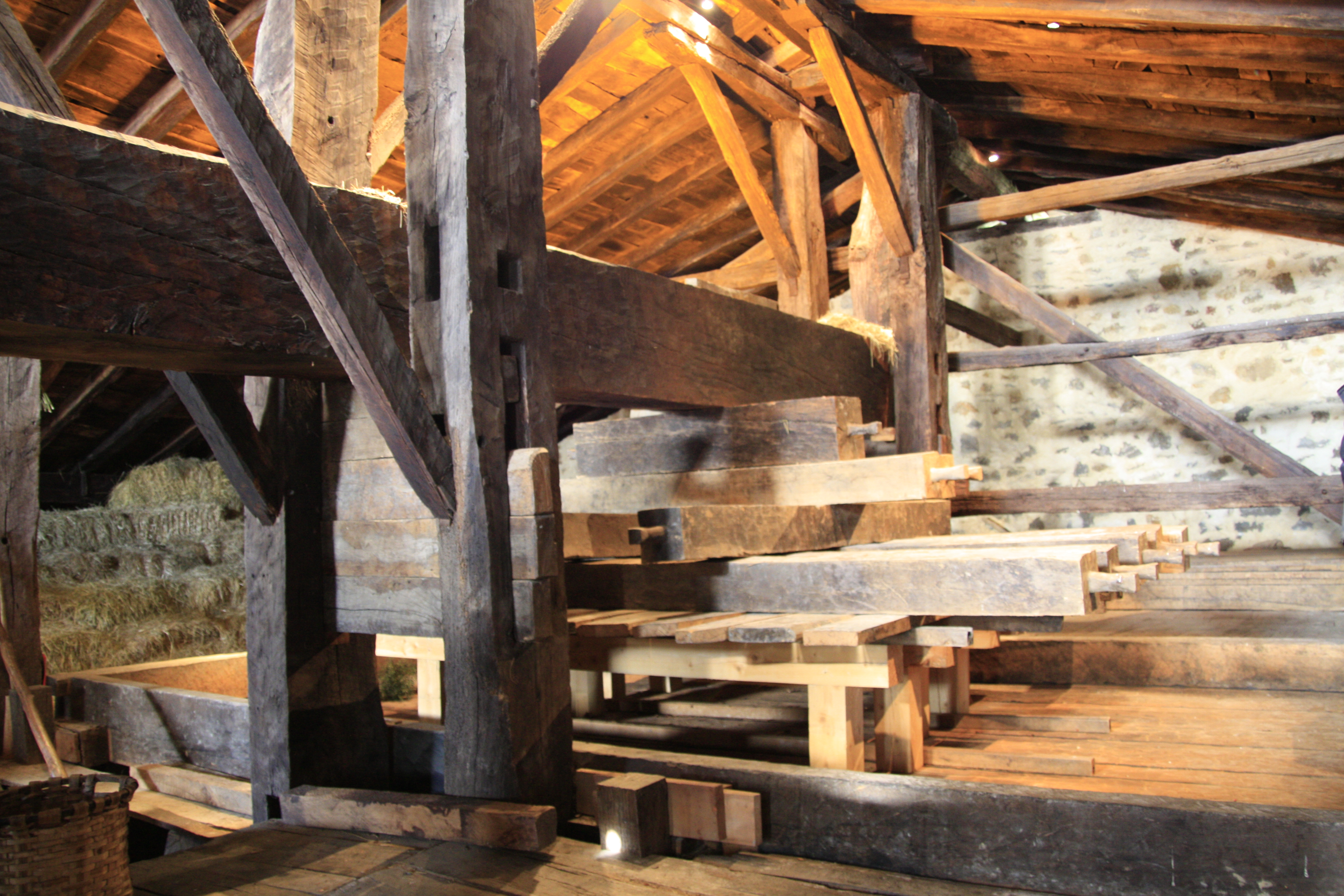
A tolare in the Igartubeiti Baserri Museum

The barrels vary in size, the smaller are called barrikotea and hold up to 100l, the barrika holds between 100-600l, the bukoia between 600-1000l and the (k)upela or (k)upa more than 1000l.

The must undergoes two fermentations:

- the first or alcoholic fermentation, an aerobic process where the natural sugar is converted to alcohol. This lasts, depending on the circumstances, between 10 days and 1.5 months.
- the second fermentation where the malic acid is converted to lactic acid. This reduces the sourness of the cider and makes it fit for consumption. This fermentation takes between 2–4 months.

Must in the Basque Country typically contains

Water	Acids	Sugars	Pectins	Tannins	Traces of
75-90%	0.1-1.0%	9-18%	0.05-2.0%	0.02-0.6%	Proteins, vitamins, minerals, enzymes etc.

The finished cider typically has an alcohol content of 5-6%. The minimum is 4.5% according to Spanish Law, less than 100 mg/L sulphur dioxide, less than 2.2g/L volatile acid and a CO_{2} pressure over 1.5 atm (at 20°C).

=== History ===
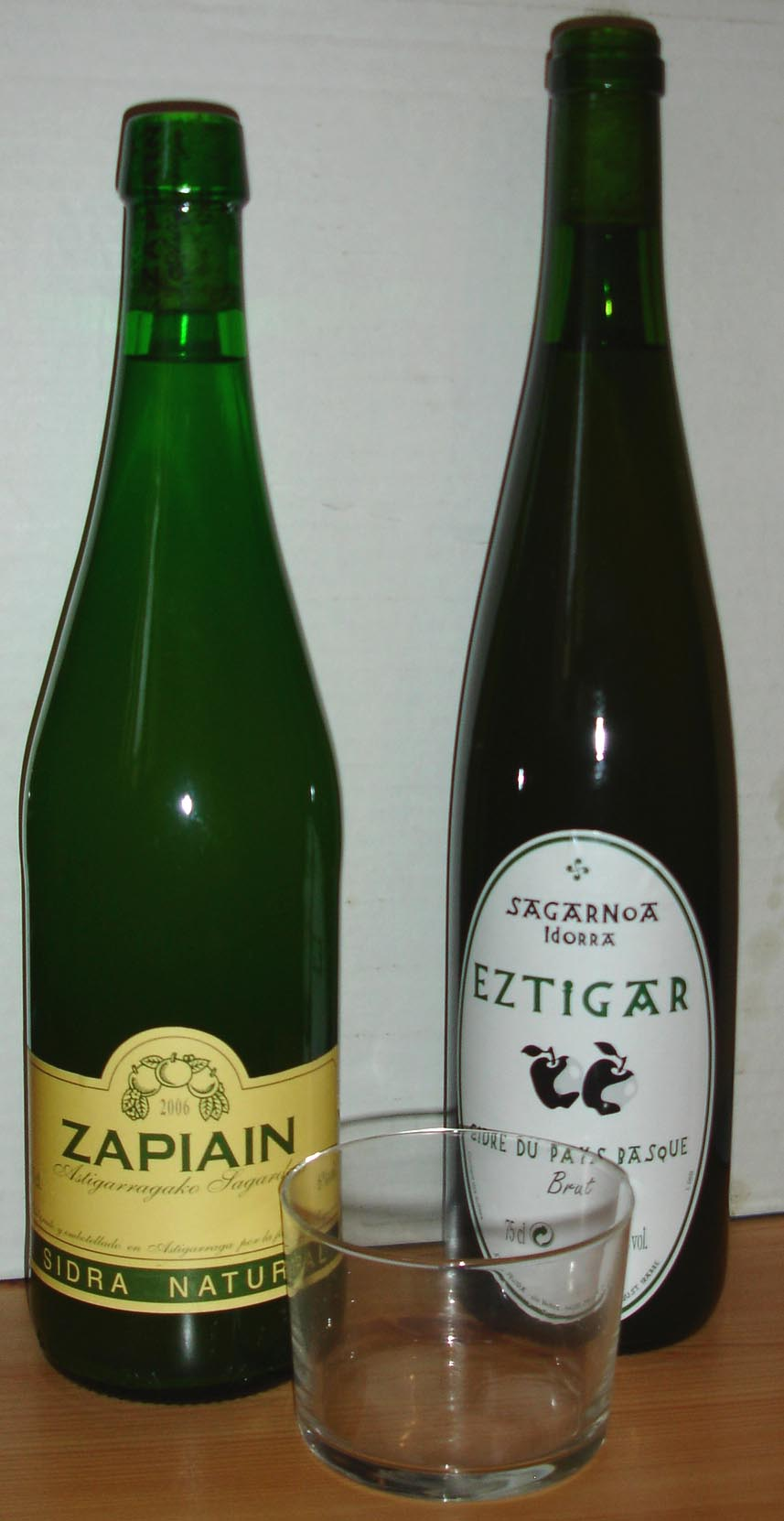
Basque bottled cider

The earliest written records on cider making and drinking go back to the 11th and 12th century. The very first is a record of Sancho III of Navarre sending an envoy to the Monastery of Leire in 1014 who mentions apples and cider-making. The other is the circa 1134 diary of the pilgrim Aymeric Picaud included in the Codex Calixtinus who mentions the Basques being notable for growing apples and drinking cider. The 16th century inquisitor Pierre de Lancre also refers to the Basque Country as "the land of the apple". It is known to have been used by Basque whalers and fishermen on their long-distance trips to Greenland and Newfoundland in preference to water.

Historically almost all Basque farm-houses had an apple-orchard (sagasti) and numerous Basque surnames and place-names are linked to the growing of apples or cider production. The earliest such reference is from 1291 where a place called Sagarro is listed in Navarrese documents. Surnames containing sagar appear in the written record from 1348 onwards: Sagastizabal "wide apple-orchard", Sagasti "apple-orchard", Bisagasti "two apple-orchards", Sagarbide "apple way", Sagastiberri "new apple-orchard", Sagastieder "beautiful apple-orchard", Sagastigoitia "upper apple-orchard" or Sagastigutxi "few apple-orchards". Later on, surnames related to the cider making process also appear such as Dolare "press", Dolaretxe "press house", Tolareberri "new press", Tolarezar "big press", Tolaretxipi "little press", Upabi "two barrels" or Upelategi "barrel building".

Traditionally gathering the apples was a communal activity. This ensured that people who did not own a press themselves would receive an amount of cider for their help in the harvest.

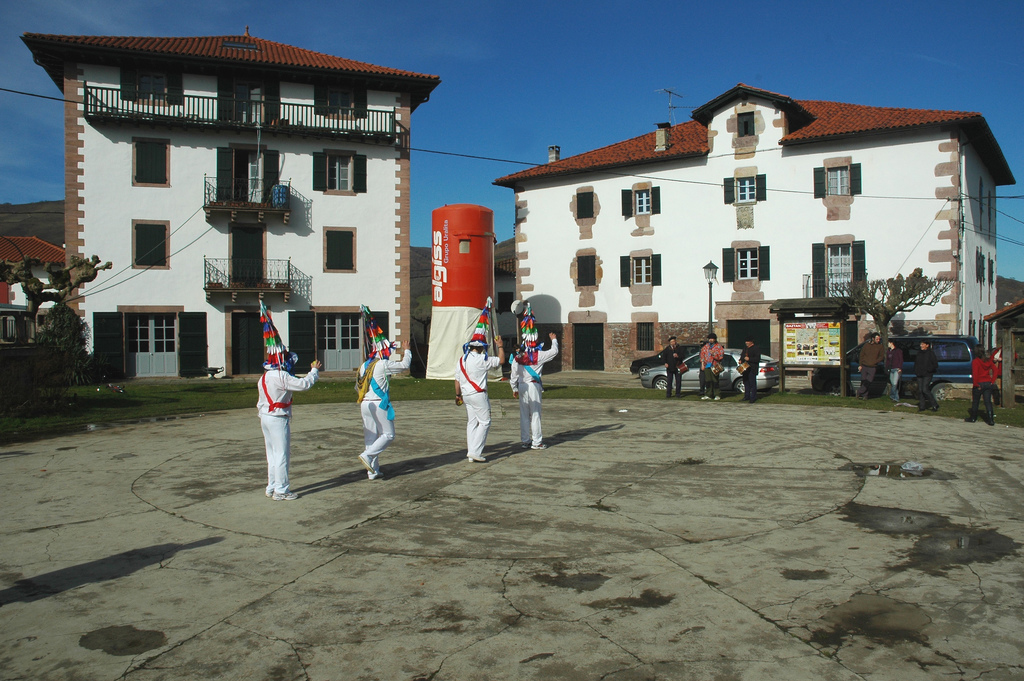
The sagar-dantza or "apple dance" in Baztan

But with the increase of wine making in Álava, the increase in the production of cereals (and the related production of beer) over the centuries led to a decline in cider consumption and the apple being regarded as food, rather than a raw material for making cider.

In the early parts of the 20th century the provincial governments supported the cider production and even subsidised the planting of apple orchards. The upheaval of the Spanish Civil War and the ensuing years of hardship resulted in many orchards being abandoned and the production of cider plummeting. It was during this period that cider production virtually ground to a halt in all provinces except Gipuzkoa.

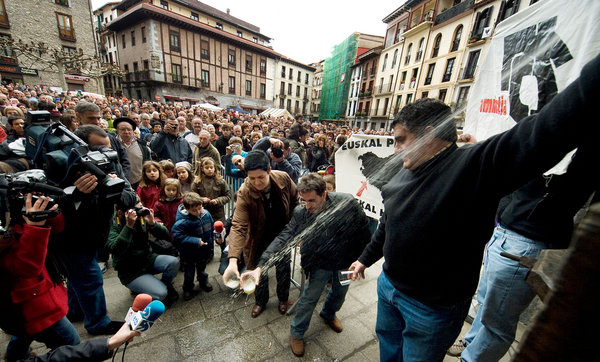
The Sagardo Eguna in Hernani (2008).

During the 1980s, the town of Usurbil pioneered the Sagardo Eguna ("cider day") to promote the drinking of cider. The first Sagardo Eguna was held in 1981 and proved to be so successful that it has been a regular event since and many other towns have followed suit, celebrating their own Sagardo Eguna.

=== Season ===
Officially the Basque cider season starts on 19 January and lasts till April/May. However, in bottled form it is available all year round. The recommendation is to consume bottled cider within one year from the date of bottling.

When served in bottles, it is usual poured holding the bottle above head level, often using a special spout, to aerate the cider.

=== Basque apple cultivars ===
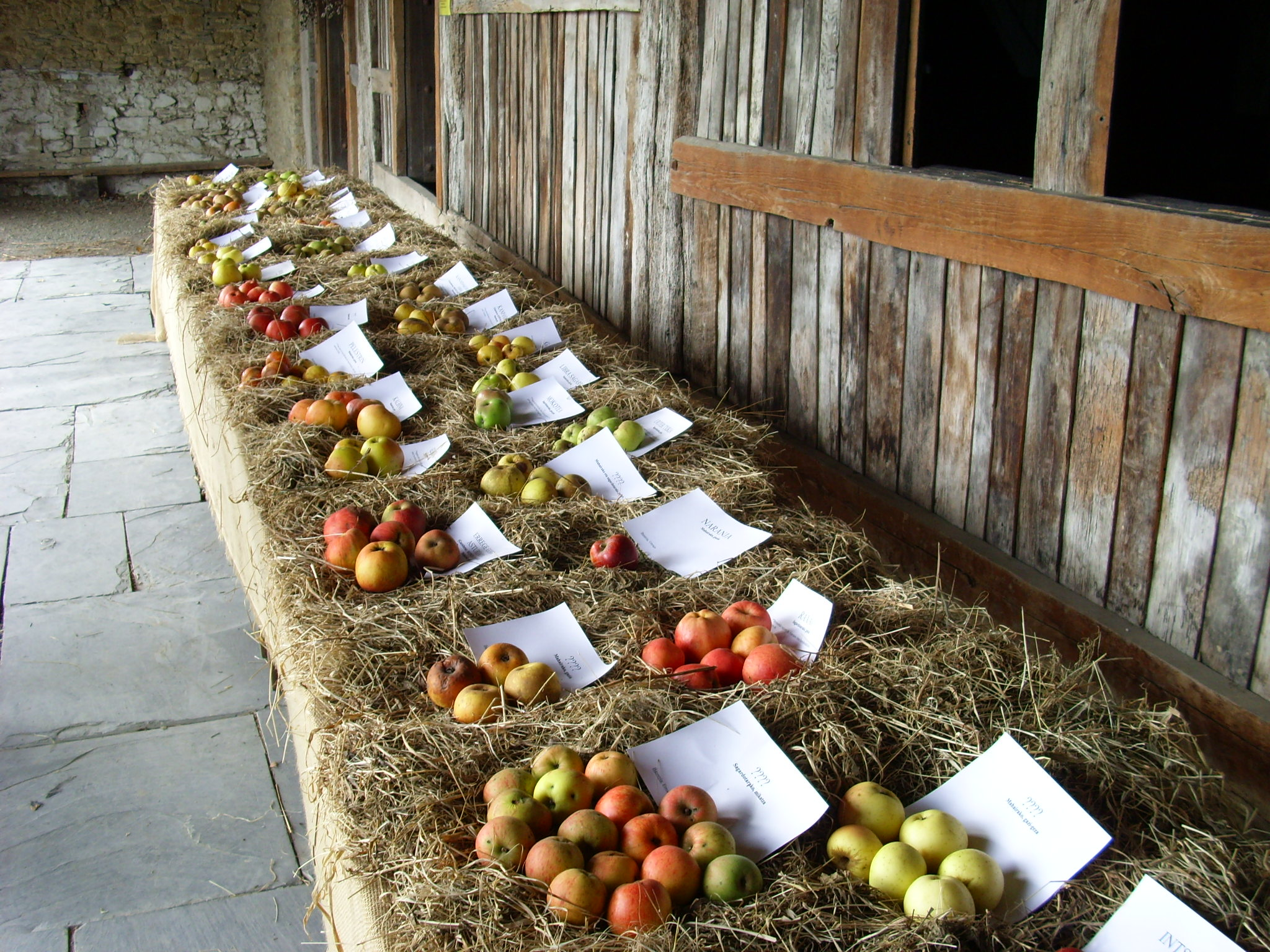
An exhibition of apple cultivars at the Igartubeiti baserri in Ezkio-Itsaso

Many varieties exist and are used for making cider. Azkue's dictionary alone, which was printed in 1905, lists more than 80 Basque varieties of apples. Depending on the desired character of the finished cider, different varieties and proportions of apple varieties are used. Some common varieties include:

- Errezila, sharp and sweet (mottled green), the most common Basque apple variety
- Geza miña, sharp; also called sagar zuria and esnaola sagarra (green)
- Goikoetxea, sharp (red)
- Mokoa, sharp (red)
- Mozoloa sweet and fresh (green)
- Patzuloa, sweet and fresh (light green)
- Txalaka sour and sweet (bright green)
- Ugarte, sour (red)
- Urdin sagarra, sharp (apple red on top and green underneath)
- Urtebi txikia, sharp (yellow-green)

=== Consumption and sales ===
More cider than wine used to be consumed in the cider producing areas in previous centuries.

Today, more than 90% of the cider produced in the Basque Country comes from Gipuzkoa and is produced by large, medium and small producers. Large producers, of which there are less than 10, account for about 60% of the total production and produce more than 300,000 litres each per year. The medium producers, of which there are between 10 and 20, account for about 20% of the production and produce between 140,000 and 300,000 litres each per year. Small producers, of which there are around 50, produce around 140,000 litres each per year and account for the remaining 20% of the share.

Around 10% of Basque cider is drunk in sagardotegis during the season, around 10% are used in the production of vinegar and the remaining 80% are sold bottled.

In 1976 the total output was 2 million litres, rising steadily to 8 million litres in 1983. This was followed by a very volatile period until the output began to rise steadily again in the 1990s, breaching the 9 million litre mark at the turn of the century.

Cider Production in Gipuzkoa
1976	1977	1983	1984	1985	1987	1988	1989	1990	1991	1992	1993	1994	1995	1996	1997	1998	1999	2000	2001
2.0	3.5	8.0	5.0	7.5	5.5	4.2	6.6	6.5	6.9	6.3	7.0	7.1	8.3	8.4	8.5	8.8	9.1	9.1	9.5

About half of the annual production is sold within Gipuzkoa, some 35% in the other 6 Basque provinces. The rest is sold within Spain and abroad.

The vast majority of Basque cider is still but there are a small number of cider houses producing sparkling cider. Previously more of these existed but many closed in the 1980s. For example, of the 4 producers of sparkling cider in Usurbil, only one remains.

=== Legislation ===
Curiously, cider is mentioned in the medieval fueros of Gipuzkoa: Se prohíbe también la introducción de sidra extranjera, a menos que esto se haga después de consumidas las de la provincia "the import of foreign cider is also prohibited unless that of the province has been consumed".

Currently, Basque cider makers are trying to attain some form of protected label such as the DOP (Denominación de Origen), IGP (Indicación Geográfica Protegida) or (EL) Eusko Label "Basque Label" as cider does not have any such label at the moment.

No specific Basque legislation exists surrounding cider but there is national Spanish legislation which states defines natural cider as la sidra elaborada siguiendo las prácticas tradicionales, sin adición de azúcares, que contiene gas carbónico de origen endógeno exclusivamente. Su graduación alcohólica adquirida será superior a 4'5 grados "cider produced following traditional methods without the addition of sugars, containing only endeogenous carbon gas. The alcohol content must exceed 4.5%". The other relevant pieces of legislation are Law 25/1970 and Decree 835/1972 which regulate address issues connected to the chemical composition of cider and cider production such as maximum sugar content, rules on production and prohibited methods (such as adding wine or alcohol).

== Linked traditions ==
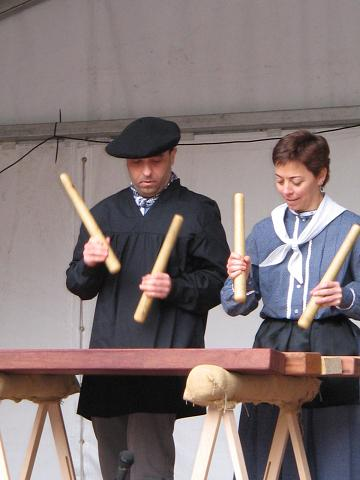
Playing the txalaparta

A musical tradition closely related to cider production is the instrument called txalaparta. The boards employed in the cider press were used as a percussion instrument by striking on them with cylindrical sticks after the cider making had finished to summon the neighbours to a celebration and to drink cider. A related but less known variant of the txalaparta is the kirikoketa.

Popular belief held that cider was good for pregnant women. As one proverb goes: sagardoak umea ekarri, kerexiak eraman "cider brings the child, cherries take it away". This sentiment is mirrored in the Spanish proverb la sidra es buena, las cerezas malas "cider is good, cherries bad".

The singing of bertsos, extemporized sung poetry, is also strongly linked to Basque cider, both being composed in sagardotegis or using cider, cider drinking or cider making as topics, such as this historic bertso from 1893:

Basque (dialectal orthography)

Lenago jendia zeguen
oso tristura aundiyan
orain jaietan kanta ditzagun
lasai sagardoteriyan

English

Previously people were
highly dispirited
but now let us sing on the fairs
at ease in the sagardotegi

== See also ==
- Cider
- Cider house
