= Lazkao =

- Municipality
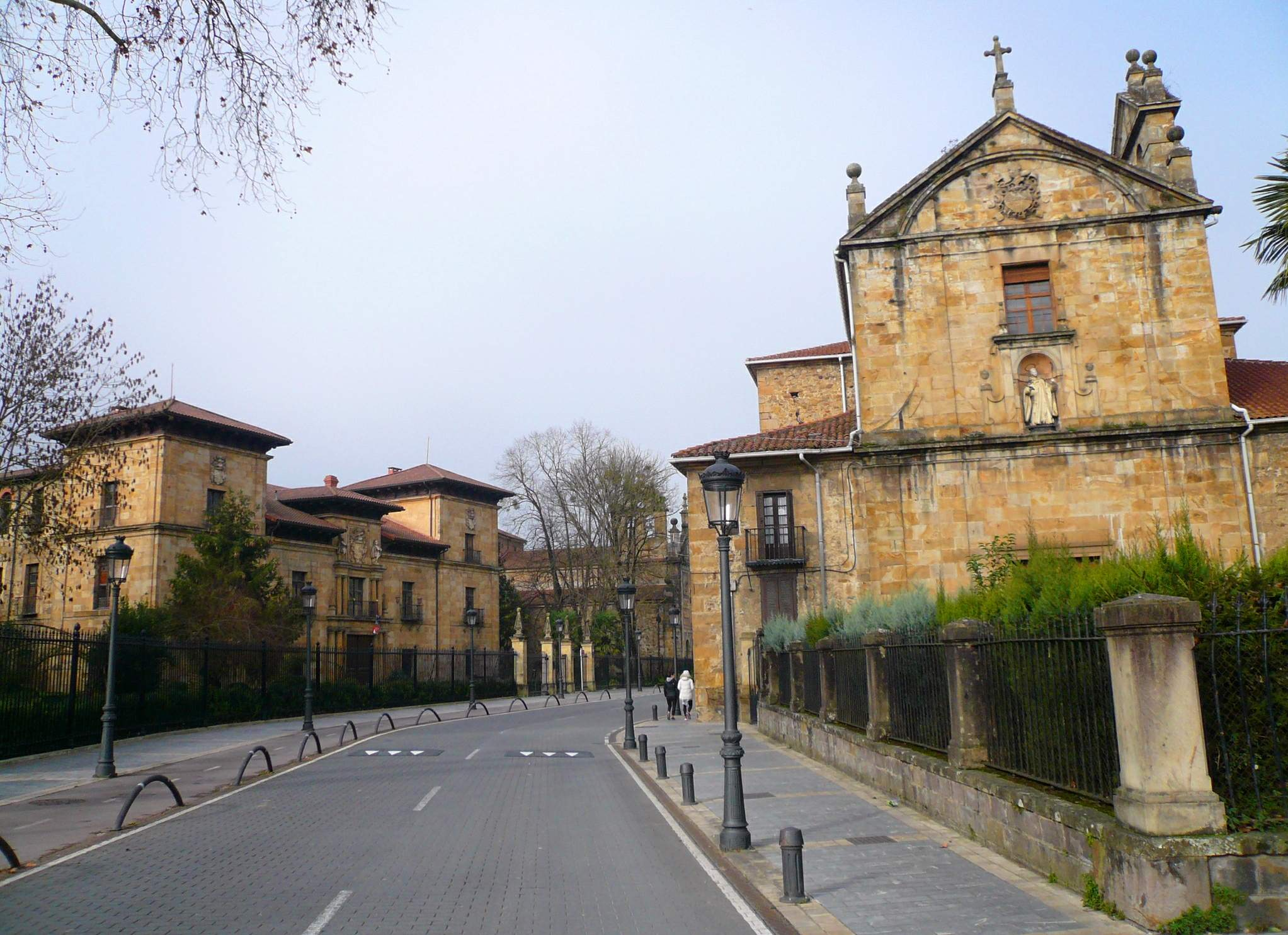

- Flag Coat of arms
- Motto(s): Lazkaoko Kontzeju Oso Zintzo eta Oso Leiala / Muy Noble y Muy Leal Concejo de Lazcano (The very noble and loyal council of Lazkao)
- Location of Lazkao within the Basque Autonomous Community
- Coordinates: 43°2′16″N 2°11′14″W
- Country: Spain
- Autonomous community: Basque Country
- Province: Gipuzkoa
- Eskualdea: Goierri

Government
  - Mayor: Kepa Zubiarrain (EAJ-PNV)

Area
  - Total: 11.4 km^{2} (4.4 sq mi)
- Elevation: 160 m (520 ft)

Population (2025-01-01)
  - Total: 6,087
  - Density: 534/km^{2} (1,380/sq mi)
- Time zone: UTC+1 (GMT)
  - Summer (DST): UTC+2 (GMT)
- Website: http://www.lazkao.eus

See Lazcano (disambiguation) (a variant form) for people with this surname.

Lazkao (Spanish: Lazcano) is a town and municipality located in the Goierri region of the province of Gipuzkoa, in the Basque Country.

== Location ==
Lazkao is located in the Southern Basque Country, in the province of Gipuzkoa, Spain. Lazkao lies in a lush valley. To its north are Beasain and Ordizia; to the south are Idiazabal and Ataun; to the east Zaldibia and to the west Olaberria.

Distances to important places

- San Sebastián: 45 km
- Madrid: 428 km
- Barcelona: 507 km

== Transport ==
- Nearest train station: In Beasain to 2 km
- Communicated with roads to these towns: Olaberria, Ataun, Ordizia, Beasain.
- Bus stations through all the town with these lines:
  - Ataun-Lazkao-Beasain
  - Ataun-Lazkao-Ordizia-Zaldibia
  - San Sebastián-Logroño
  - San Sebastián-Pamplona
- Airports:
  - Airport of Hondarribia (San Sebastián): 58 km
  - Airport of Loiu (Bilbao): 86 km
  - Airport of Noain (Pamplona): 68 km
  - Airport of Foronda (Vitoria-Gasteiz): 83 km

== History ==
Many Basque historians think that Lazkao was founded in 1053.

=== 1936–1939 ===
Two men were shot in Lazkao during the Spanish Civil War.

=== ETA ===
The future leader of ETA, Eustakio Mendizabal, studied at the Benedictine monastery in Lazkao from 1954 to 1966.

In 2005, a Benedictine monk of the town was arrested by the Spanish National Police and by the Guardia Civil. They thought that the monk had connections with the Basque separatist group ETA. In 2006, ETA detonated a bomb in the company Azkar, because Azkar did not pay the revolutionary tax to the group.

== Culture ==
2007 was the Second anniversary of bicentenary of the arrival of the Benedictine monks to the town. Celebrated by the Deputy-General of Gipuzkoa and by Juan Jose Ibarretxe, the Lehendakari (Basque Prime Minister) of the Basque Autonomous Community.

Day of the Donkey (Basque: Astotxo Eguna) is held every first Sunday in January. On this day, the Flight to Egypt is performed throughout the street of the town.

This Biblical passage was first performed in Lazkao the 17th century. Nowadays, the Nuns of the Convent of Lazkao continue to sell the traditional wafers for this event.

== Notable people ==
- Lazkao Txiki (1926–1993), bertsolari poet and musician
- Joseba Beloki (born 1973), bicycle racer
