= Asier Santana =

Spanish football manager (born 1979)

Personal information
- Full name: Asier Santana Clavo
- Date of birth: 3 February 1979 (age 47)
- Place of birth: Idiazabal, Spain

Managerial career
- Years: Team
- 2006–2008: Real Sociedad (youth)
- 2008–2013: Real Sociedad B (assistant)
- 2013–2014: Real Sociedad B
- 2014: Real Sociedad (interim)
- 2014–2016: Real Sociedad (assistant)
- 2016–2017: Real Unión
- 2020: UCAM Murcia
- 2021: Portugalete

Asier Santana Clavo (born 3 February 1979) is a Spanish football manager.

== Manager career ==
Born in Idiazabal, Goierri, Gipuzkoa, Santana joined Real Sociedad in 2006, being appointed manager of the youth setup. In 2008, he moved to the reserve squad, being Imanol Idiakez and Meho Kodro's assistant.

On 17 June 2013, Santana was named manager of the B-team, signing a two-year deal. On 5 November of the following year, he was appointed at the helm of the main squad, as an interim, replacing fired Jagoba Arrasate.

Santana appeared in his first professional match on 9 November 2014, a 2–1 home win against Atlético Madrid. He was subsequently named David Moyes' assistant, remaining in the first team.

In June 2016, Santana was hired by third-tier Real Unión but still on the payroll of Sociedad, who were helping out with the Irun-based club's financial problems. He was dismissed on 27 November 2017 due to a poor run of results, with the severance payment being again the responsibility of the larger club.

Santana returned to the game on 29 January 2020, taking over at UCAM Murcia until the end of the season.

== Managerial statistics ==
As of 7 April 2021

Managerial record by team and tenure
Team	Nat	From	To	Record								Ref
Team	Nat	From	To	G	W	D	L	GF	GA	GD	Win %	Ref
Real Sociedad B	(Spain)	17 June 2013	16 November 2014	50	18	15	17	63	54	+9	36.00	
Real Sociedad (interim)	(Spain)	5 November 2014	10 November 2014	1	1	0	0	2	1	+1	100.00	
Real Unión	(Spain)	1 July 2016	27 November 2017	64	24	19	21	61	66	−5	37.50	
UCAM Murcia	(Spain)	29 January 2020	30 June 2020	6	3	1	2	7	6	+1	50.00	
Portugalete	(Spain)	20 January 2021	30 June 2021	17	5	4	8	14	17	−3	29.41	
Total				138	51	39	48	147	144	+3	36.96	—
