= Zumarraga, Spain =

Zumarraga
- Municipality
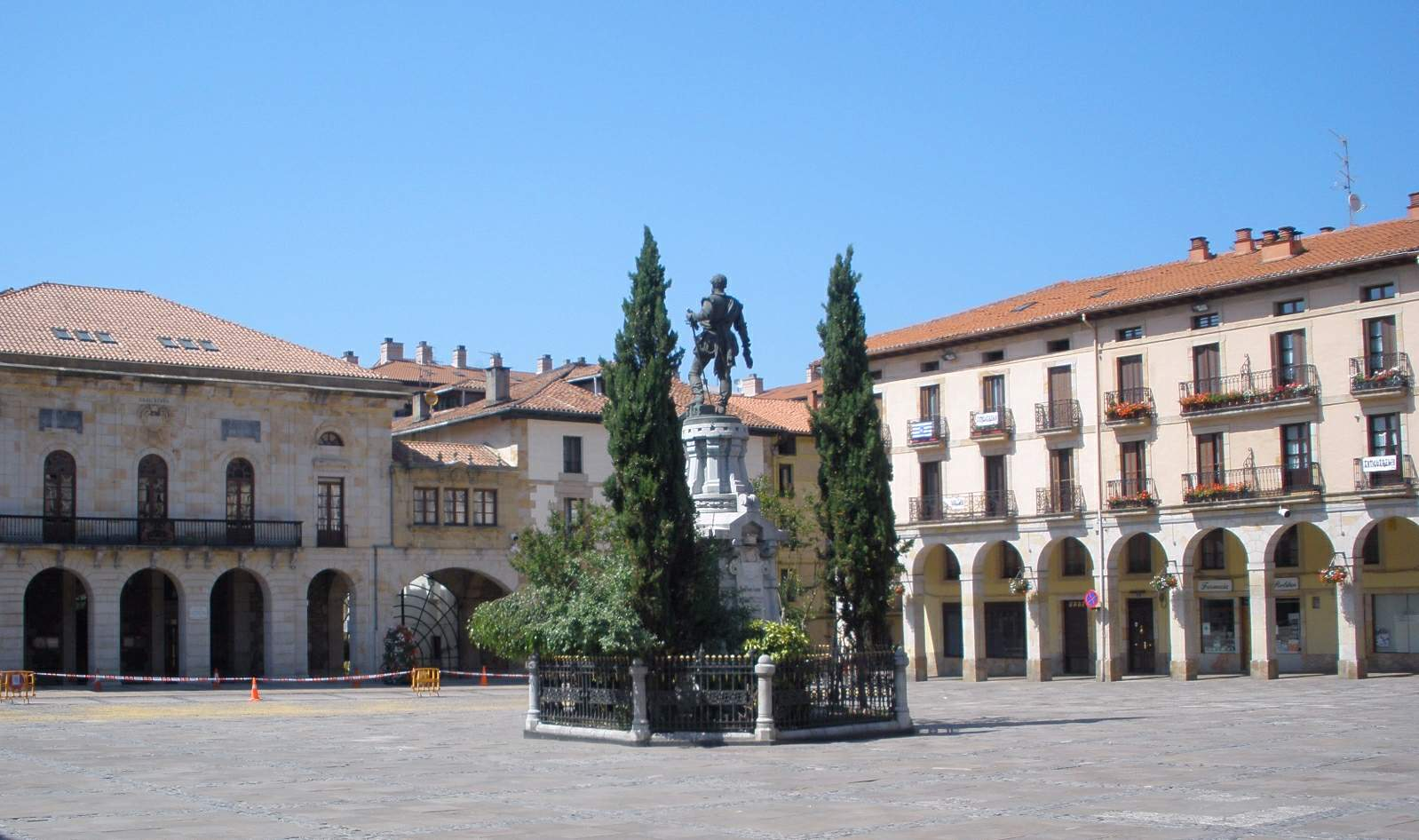

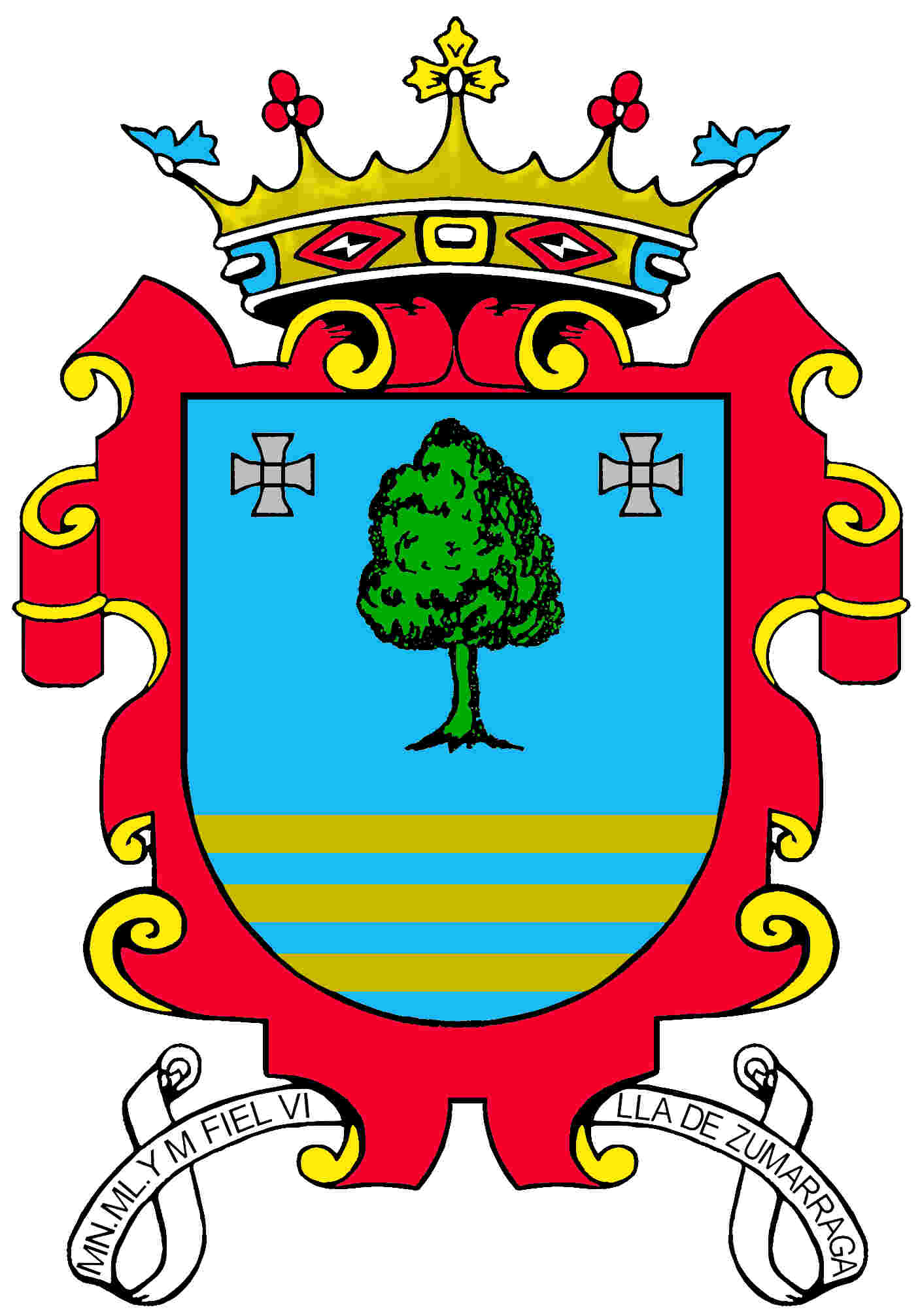
- Coat of arms
- Motto: Muy Noble, Muy Leal y Muy Fiel Villa de Zumárraga
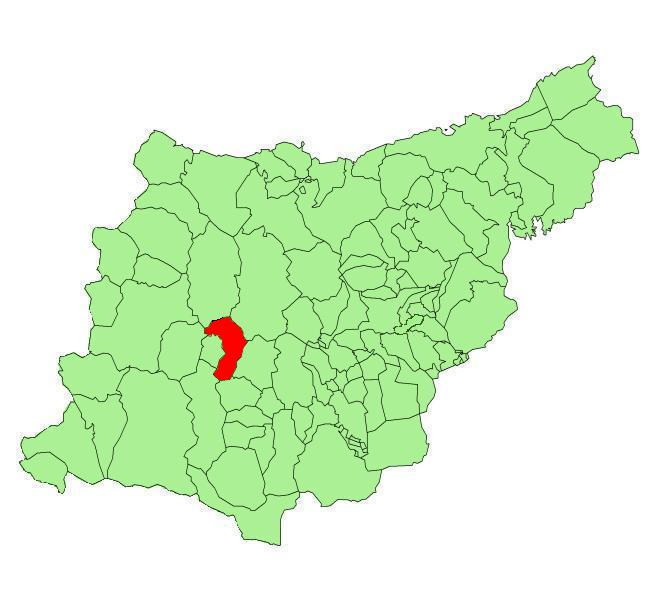

- Location of San Sebastián within the Basque Autonomous Community Zumarraga (Spain)
- Coordinates: 43°04′59″N 2°19′0″W
- Country: Spain
- Autonomous community: Basque Country
- Province: Gipuzkoa
- Eskualdea: Urola Garaia

Government
  - Mayor: Mikel Serrano Aperribay (2015) (PSE-EE)

Area
  - Land: 19.42 km^{2} (7.50 sq mi)
- Elevation: 356 m (1,168 ft)

Population (2025-01-01)
  - Total: 9,678
  - Density: 507.11/km^{2} (1,313.4/sq mi)
- Time zone: UTC+1 (CET)
  - Summer (DST): UTC+2 (CEST)
- Postal codes: 20700
- Website: www.zumarraga.eus

Zumarraga ([s̻umaraɣa]) is a municipality and industrial town in Gipuzkoa province of the Basque Country autonomous community of northern Spain, approximately 35 miles (56 km) by road southwest of San Sebastián and 10 miles (16 km) northwest of Idiazabal. As of 2018 the municipality had a population of 9834 people. The Urola river flows through the vicinity. It is the birthplace of Miguel López de Legazpi, a conquistador who explored the Pacific Islands and the East Indies, and of Iñaki Urdangarín, the husband of Infanta Cristina of Spain.

== History ==
In 1446 a battle took place there during the War of the Bands. In the 15th-century, the bridge that separates the municipalities of Zumárraga and Urretxu was named after the Zufiaur family.

== Geography ==
Zumárraga is situated in the Gipuzkoan valley of Alto Urola. The valley is narrow with a width of about 3 kilometres (1.9 mi). On the west, the Urola River separates it from the neighboring Urrechu, with which it forms an urban area. In the south, it borders with Legazpi and Gaviria, in the west with Ezkio-Itsaso, and in the north with Azpeitia and Azkoitia. The main mountains of Zumárraga are Samiño (930 metres (3,050 ft)), Izazpi (967 metres (3,173 ft)), and Beloqui (660 metres (2,170 ft)).

Some of the main neighborhoods and streets include Secundino Esnaola, Etxeberri, Orbegozo, Plaza Leturias, Argixao, Eitza, Avenue Padre Urdaneta, Ipar Haizea, Agiña, San Cristóbal, Eliz-kale, Bidezar, Izazpi, Search Isusi, Oquendo, Plaza Navarra, Piedad, Legazpi, Soraitz, Avenue Euskal Herria, San Isidro, and Txurruka.

== Economy ==
Following the building of the railway in the late 19th century the Justo Artiz factory was built in 1885. It become known for its wicker baskets. After the Spanish Civil War, the iron and steel industry took off with the building of the Estaban Orbegozo factory, which saw an influx of workers from surrounding areas.

== Celebrations ==
- 2 July, Santa Isabel
- 15 August, Day of the Virgin
- 13 December, Santa Lucía/Santa Luzia
- 15 May, San Isidro

== Notable landmarks ==
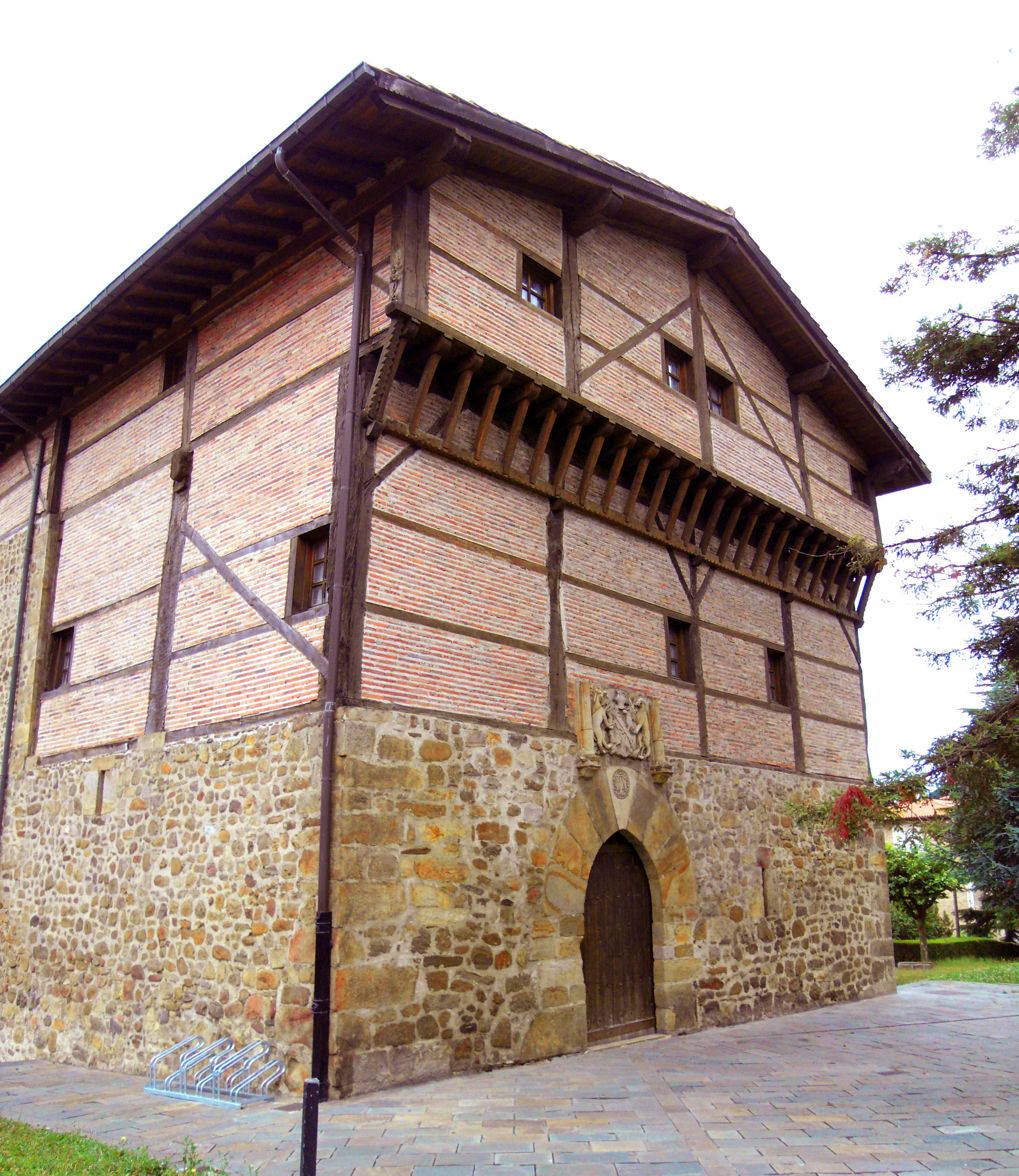
Legazpi Tower, birthplace of Miguel López de Legazpi.

Plaza de Euskadi contains a monument dedicated to Miguel López de Legazpi, the Plaza Porticada, and the Casa Uzcanga, built in 1867 by José Antonio de Alberdi. Caserío Aitzabaso, also known as "Areizaga Dorrea", is an old building known for its arches in the Barrio of Aranburu. Caserío Gurrutxaga Goikoa and Caserío Aizpuru lie in the Barrio of Soraitz. The municipal cemetery is noted for its underground crypt designed by the architect José Antonio Pizarro, influenced by Ancient Egypt. There are two sculptures, "El Ángel de la vida" and "El Ángel de la muerte", the work of sculptor Vicente Larrea.

Church of Santa María de la Asunción was first built in 1576. The tower was added in the 18th century. Ermita de San Gregorio and Ermita de San Cristóbal are hermitages which both date to 1540. Templo del Convento de las Hermanas Mercedarias de la Caridad was constructed in 1930 while the Templo parroquial El Salvador was opened in October 1971, a modern building designed by the architect Iñigo Guibert de Encío. The Argizao Stadium caters for local football matches and athletics events. To the east of the stadium is Zumarraga Hospital. The Instituto De Educacion Secundaria Jose Maria Iparraguirre is situated in the northwestern outskirts of the town.

The ultra-modern Lamorous-Argixao old people's home (Centro gerontológico Lamorous Argixao/Lamorous Argixao zaharren egoitza) inaugurated in September 2008 offers accommodation for 115 seniors, including 30 psycho-geriatric units and 30 day care spaces. In July 2019, an outdoor meeting area was added to the centre.

== Politics ==
Party	Votes	%	+/-	Seats	+/-
PSE-EE (PSOE)	1,935	42.05	▼6.63	6	▼1
EH Bildu	1,577	34.27	▲12.25	5	▲2
Basque Nationalist	675	14.67	▼2.98	2	0
Elkarrekin Podemos/Ezker Anitza/IU/Berdeak Equo	270	5.86	▼0.35	0	▼1
PP	73	1.58	▼0.65	0	0
PSE-EE loss to no overall control (PSE-EE minority)					

== Notable people ==
- Miguel López de Legazpi (1502–1572): conquistador of the Philippines
- José Ignacio de Aguirrebengoa (1765–1848): merchant who made his fortune in Mexico and France
- Nicolás de Soraluce (1820–1884): mayor of Donostia-San Sebastián
- Secundino Esnaola (1878–1929): musician and composer
- Antonio Juantegui (1898–1966): international footballer of the 1920s who competed in the 1924 Olympic Games
- Iñaki Linazasoro (1931–2004): writer
- Juan María Mújica (1963–2004): footballer of the 1980s and 1990s who played for Real Sociedad and Deportivo
- Ángel Cruz Jaca (1914–2005): historian and promoter of culture
- Juan María Urdangarin (1932–2012): industrial engineer and businessman, director of Caja Vital
- María del Pilar Sanchis (1933): cartoonist
- Begoña García Retegui (1955): politician of the PSOE who has had a career in the Region of Murcia
- Pello Lizarralde (1956): professor, translator and writer in the Basque language
- Miguel Bilbao Beraza (1961): painter
- Josu Jon Imaz (1963): chemist and politician who was leader of the Partido Nacionalista Vasco (2004–08).
- Andoni Salamero (1966): writer and poet
- José Joaquín Ormazábal Fernández (1967): lawyer, politician and LGBT activist in Castile-La Mancha
- Iñaki Urdangarin (1968): the husband of Infanta Cristina of Spain, and former handball player and international handball judge
- Ikerne Badiola (1971): politician of the Eusko Alkartasuna.
- Aitor González Jiménez (1975): cyclist, winner of the Vuelta a España in 2002
- Susana Fraile (1978): international handball judge, appeared at the 2004 Olympic Games in Athens
- Mikel Balenziaga (1988): footballer (Athletic Bilbao)
- Nerea Gabirondo (1990): footballer who plays for Real Sociedad Femenino
- Dani García (1990): footballer (Eibar, Athletic Bilbao)
- Elene Lete (2002): footballer (London City Lionesses)
