= Caínzos =

Caínzos or Cainzos are Spanish spellings for the Basque surname Gaintza ("mountainous or pasturable land") and placename; there are two small villages in the province of Gipuzkoa, the Basque Country, northern Spain, with this name.

== Historical Parish Records ==
On 7 October 1629, María Cainzos-Come, daughter of Bartolomé Caínzos and María Come, was baptised at the church of "Santa María de la Anunciación", in Robladillo (today, the province of Valladolid).

On 23 April 1693, María Francisca Gainza-Artaza, daughter of Diego Gainza and María Artaza, was baptised at the church of "Santa Fe", in Caparroso (province of Navarra).

== Coat of arms ==
Over the centuries, there have been many different coat of arms associated with this surname. At the "Real Chancillería de Valladolid" there are different records for this surname amongst other "Expedientes de Hidalguía" held in their archive. Which are open for public use, genealogists and family historians.

== Surname distribution ==
These days there are people with this surname in different parts of the world most notably in Spain and Argentina.

Spain In accordance with the data provided by the INE 2007 the distribution of this surname in Spain is as follows:

- In Galicia, where most of the people with this surname is found in the Province of A Corunna
- In the Basque Country, where most people with this surname is found in Province of Biscay

Argentina In the Province of Tucumán, where not only people with this surname were amongst the first Europeans to arrive in South America but they were, and still are, related to some of the most powerful land owner families in Argentina

== People ==
- Jesús María Caínzos Fernández Vicepresident of BBVA since 28 January 2000
- Agustín Gaínza-Vicandi (a.k.a. "Piru") Footballer from the Basque Country in Spain, Athletic Club de Bilbao 1940s and 1950s
- Julio Cainzo Sugar Businessman Province of Tucumán, Argentina (1880–1950).
