= Eustakio Mendizabal =

Basque writer (1944–1973)

- Born: Eustaquio Mendizabal Benito; 9 October 1944; Itsasondo, Spain
- Died: 19 April 1973 (aged 28); Algorta, Spain
- Other name: Txikia

Eustakio Mendizabal Benito (9 October 1944 – 19 April 1973), commonly known by his nom-de-guerre Txikia, was the leader of the Basque separatist group ETA-V from August 1971 until his death in April 1973.

== Biography ==
=== Early years ===
Eustakio Mendizabal was born on 9 October 1944, in the small village of Itsasondo, Gipuzkoa. At age 10, he was sent to a Benedictine monastery in Lazkao, where he remained for 12 years until leaving the order in 1966.

=== Career in ETA ===
Txikia was the right-hand man of Juan Jose Etxabe, the leader of ETA's Military Front during the 1960s. After an organizational assembly in September 1970 concluded with ETA officially branding itself as Marxist-Leninist, the Military Front of ETA refused to accept the policy changes, forming a splinter group called ETA-V (while the Marxist-Leninist ETA would become known as ETA-VI). ETA-VI initially enjoyed substantially more popular support, and in 1971 the dispirited Juan Jose Etxabe stepped down as leader of ETA-V to retire from armed struggle.

With Etxabe gone, Eustakio 'Txikia' Mendizabal took charge of ETA-V. Mendizabal placed emphasis on action above theory, and was committed to armed insurrection in the Basque Country. Under his leadership, ETA-V began a campaign of bank robberies throughout 1971 and 1972 to fund its activities, and stole over 3000 kilograms of Goma-2 explosives from a powder magazine. While not as left-leaning as their counterparts in ETA-VI, ETA-V did intervene in two high-profile labour disputes. They kidnapped Basque industrialist Lorenzo Zabala in 1972, successfully forcing him to hire back some 200 workers he had laid off. In 1973, they kidnapped wealthy business owner Felipe Huarte, whom they likewise demanded to rehire laid-off workers, and this time received a considerable ransom payment (50 million pesetas). During the leadership of Txikia, an ETA commando was sent to Madrid to begin planning a kidnapping operation of Francisco Franco's heir apparent, Admiral Luis Carrero Blanco.

=== Death and legacy ===
Eustakio Mendizabal was tracked down by the police and shot in the head in Algorta, Bizkaia in April 1973. The ETA commando in Madrid named itself Comando Txikia in honour of the much-admired ETA martyr. Contrary to popular belief, an operation against Luis Carrero Blanco was already being planned when Mendizabal died, and Comando Txikia was not created specifically to avenge his death. Ultimately, the commando assassinated Luis Carrero Blanco in December 1973, after his nomination as Prime Minister of Spain made the original kidnapping plan unfeasible.

A song was written about Txikia by Telesforo Monzón, called "Txikia zuen guda izena."

A plaza in Algorta was named 'Plaza Txikia' in honour of the slain ETA leader, but in 2017 the Superior Court of Justice in the Basque Country ruled that the name must be changed, because it 'violates the dignity of victims of terrorism'.
