= Gavira =

Gavira is a surname. Notable people with the surname include:

- Adrián Gavira (born 1987), Spanish beach volleyball player
- Emilio Gavira (born 1964), Spanish actor
- Gonzalo Gavira (1925–2005), Mexican movie sound technician
- Pablo Martín Páez Gavira (born 2004), Spanish footballer

== See also ==
- Gaviria
