= Arama River =

Arama River may refer to:

- Arama River (Bistrița)
- Aramá River, a river of Pará state in north-central Brazil

== See also ==
- Arama, name of several places
