= Treasure of Gazteluberri =

- Tesoro de Gazteluberri
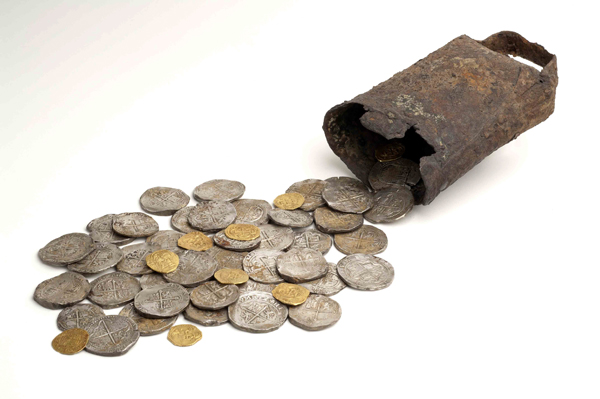
- Set of coins of the mint of Seville
- Material: Gold, silver and iron
- Period/culture: 1537-1556
- Discovered: 1960; Segura (Guipúzcoa)
- Discovered by: Juan Berasategui y Urquía and Eugenio Martín Zazo
- Present location: National Archaeological Museum (Madrid)
- Registration: 233

The Treasure of Gazteluberri is a set of coins, of different materials gold, silver and iron, buried at the end of the 16th century CE or the beginning of the 17th. It contains pieces of Joanna I, Philip II and Charles I stored within a cowbell coming from the mint of Seville. Currently it can be found at the Museo Arqueológico Nacional, in Madrid with the inventory number 233.

== Discovery ==
Its discovery took place in 1960 by Juan Berasategui y Urquía and Eugenio Martín Zazo in the municipality of Segura, Guipúzcoa.

The environment and location of the finding may indicate the Treasure was buried in a moment of instability with the purpose of keeping it safe, therefore its property may have been linked some rancher or smuggler.
