= Cider house =

Type of alcoholic drinking establishment

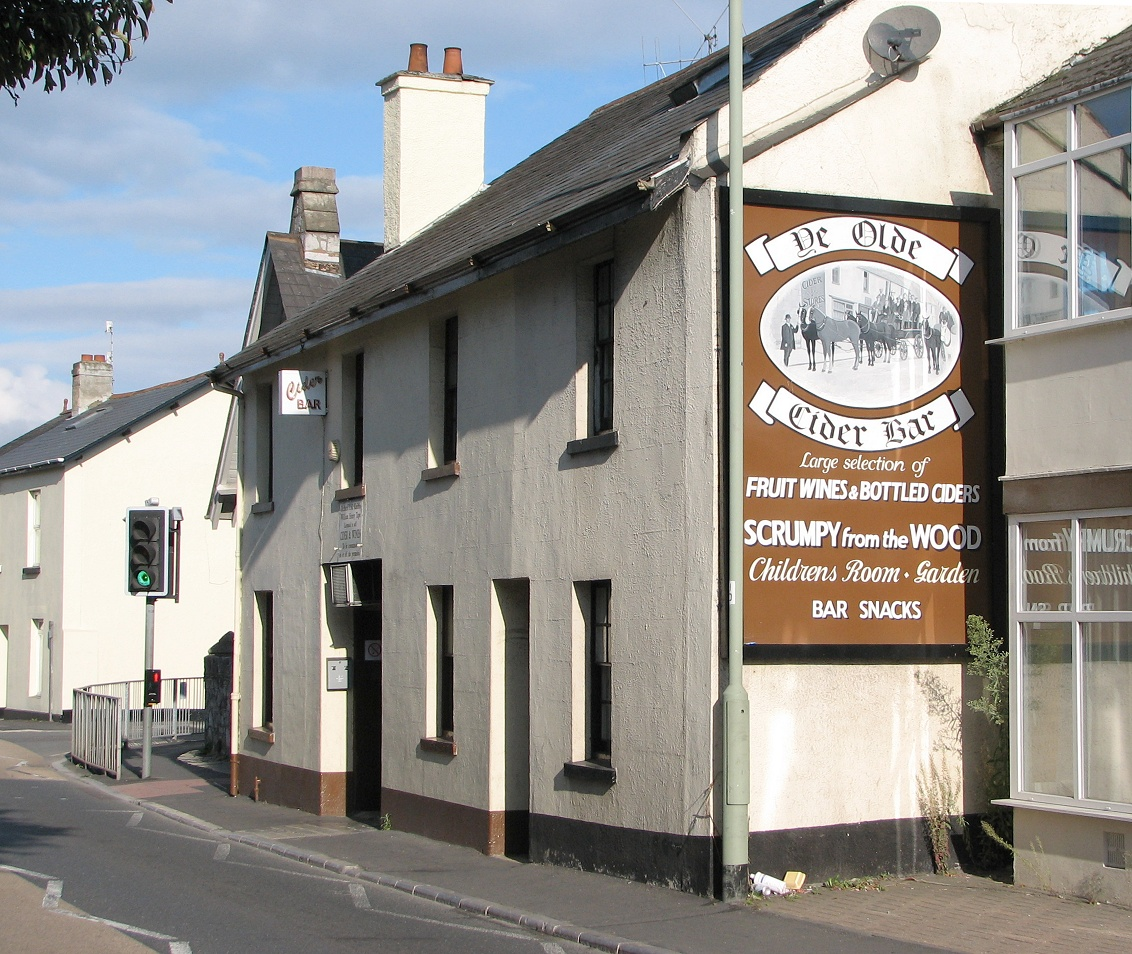
Ye Olde Cider Bar in East Street, Newton Abbot.

A cider house is an establishment that sells alcoholic cider for consumption on the premises. Some cider houses also sell cider "to go", for consumption off the premises. A traditional cider house was often little more than a room in a farmhouse or cottage, selling locally fermented cider.

== History ==
Cider houses were once common selling a product that was usually fermented on the premises from apples grown in a local cider orchard. In the United States, the European colonists planted apple trees in the Massachusetts Bay Colony. It was nine years after first landing at Plymouth in 1620. "The Laird & Company Distillery in New Jersey" was the first distillery license issued in the United States, in 1780. The Industrial Revolution caused people to leave the orchards and move to the cities for work causing many orchards to be abandoned. This began the decline of Cider Houses in the late 1800s. "By the time Prohibition was enacted in 1919, the production of cider in the U.S. had slipped to only 13 million gallons, down from 55 million gallons in 1899." Because of changes in the taxation of cider in the early 1970s, and social changes, most cider houses now exist in name only.

"Today, cider is one of the fastest-growing segments of the liquor industry" thus the emergence of more Cider Houses. With the popularity of Cider Houses, Cider Museums are emerging as well. At these museums, people can visit to learn the history of Cider and Cider Houses.

Cider houses are common in Asturias, where they are called sidrerías or chigres, and the Basque Country, where they are called sagardotegi. As cider has gained popularity during the 21st century, especially in countries such as Australia, 'bar & restaurant style' cider houses are opening; the Brunswick St Cider House in Melbourne is an example.

A few do still exist in, for example, the West Country of the United Kingdom. There are approximately more than 725 Cider Houses & Producers currently in the United States.

== See also ==
- Public house
- List of public house topics
