= Zerain =

Town in Basque Country, Spain

Coordinates: 43°0′45″N 2°16′24″W

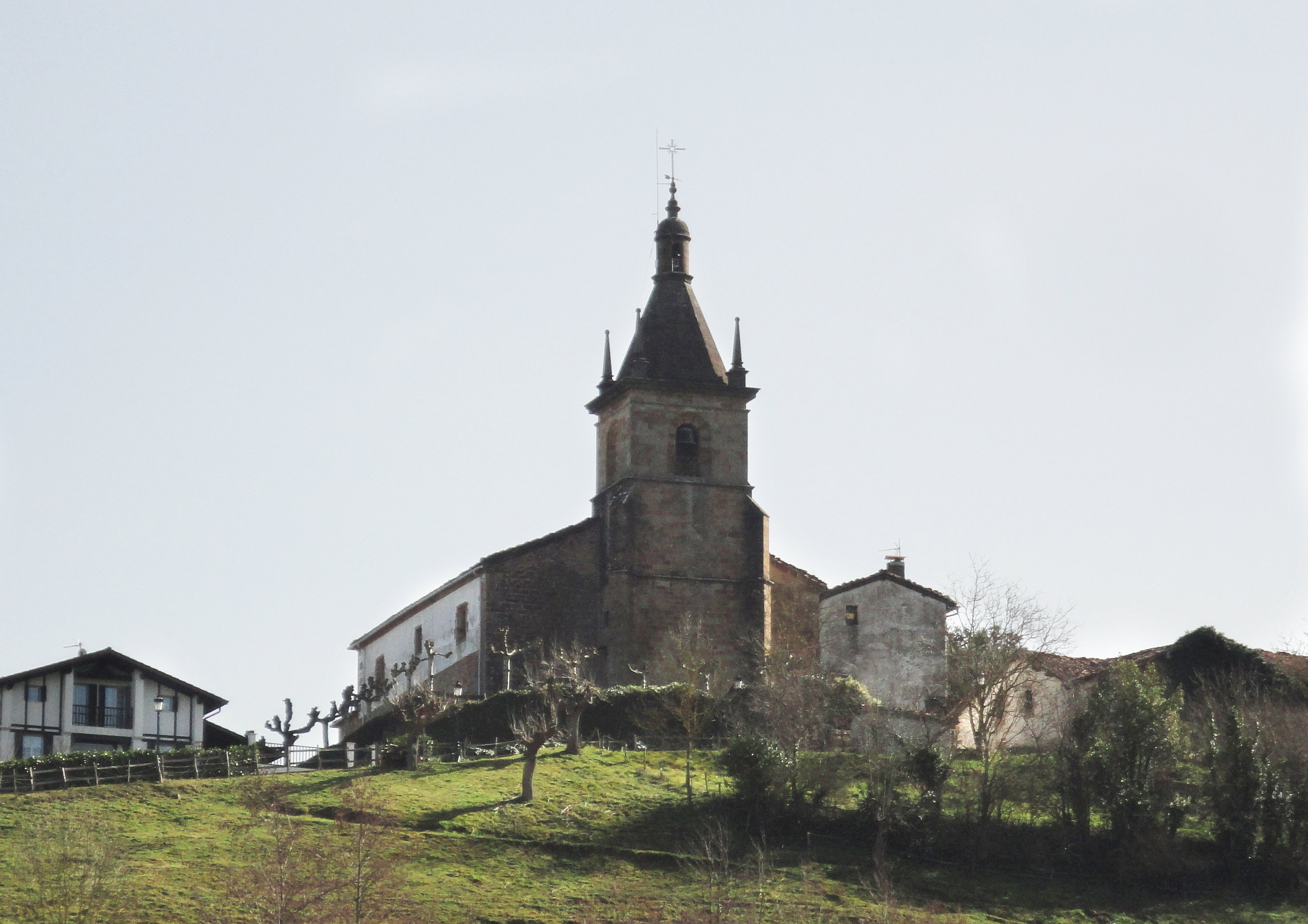
Church of Our Lady of the Assumption, Zerain, Spain

Zerain is a town and municipality located in the Goierri region of the province of Gipuzkoa, in the autonomous community of the Basque Country, northern Spain.
