= Arama =

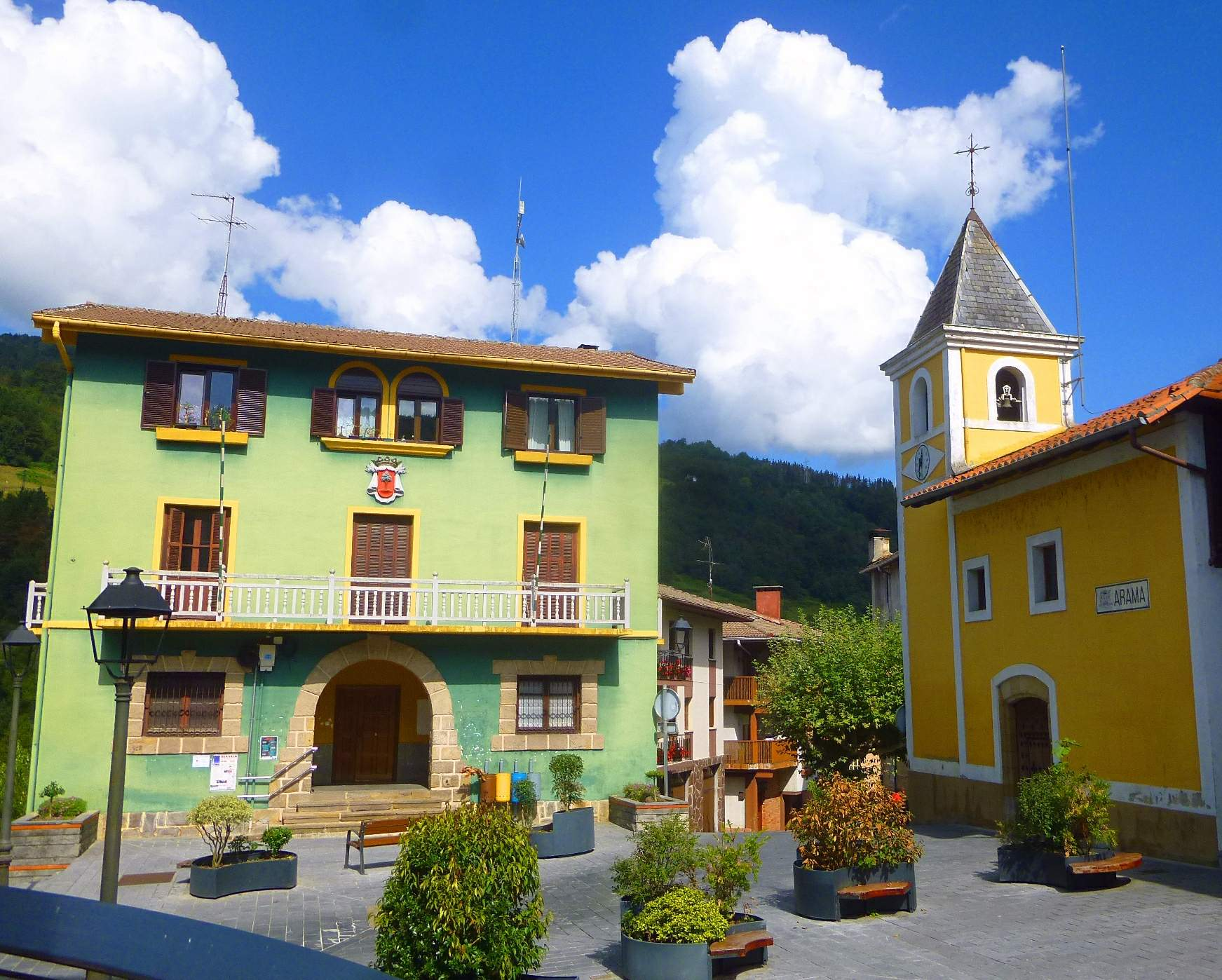
- View of Arama

- Coat of arms

- Location of Arama within the Basque Country
- Coordinates: 43°03′48″N 2°09′56″W
- Country: Spain
- Autonomous community: Basque Country
- Province: Gipuzkoa
- Eskualdea: Goierri

Area
  - Total: 1.32 km^{2} (0.51 sq mi)
- Elevation: 163 m (535 ft)

Population (2025-01-01)
  - Total: 173
  - Density: 131/km^{2} (339/sq mi)
- Time zone: UTC+1 (CET)
  - Summer (DST): UTC+2 (CEST)
- Website: www.aramaudala.net

Arama is a town located in the Goierri region of the province of Gipuzkoa, in the autonomous community of the Basque Country, in the north of Spain.
