= Goierri =

Coordinates: 42°59′26″N 2°14′05″W

- Eskualdea / Comarca
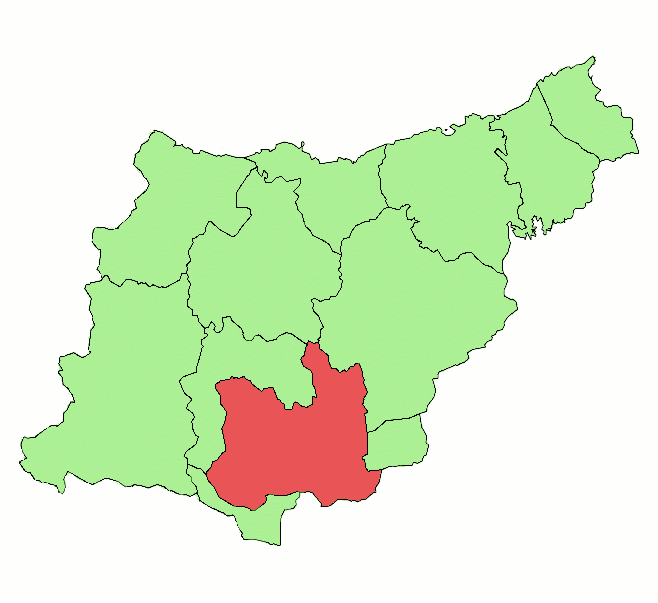
- Country: Spain
- Autonomous community: Basque Country
- Province: Gipuzkoa
- Main admin. HQ: Beasain

Population (2018)
  - Total: 44,038
- Time zone: UTC+1 (CET)
  - Summer (DST): UTC+2 (CEST)

Goierri ("Highland(s)" in Basque; Spanish: Goyerri) or "Basque Highlands" is one of the eight comarcas (Eskualdea in the Basque language) in the Spanish province of Gipuzkoa. It is composed of 18 municipalities, Beasain, Ordizia and Lazkao being the main towns. The main administrative center is Beasain.

== Municipalities ==
Municipality	Population 2001	Population 2011	Population 2018
Altzaga	106	161	179
Arama	163	198	205
Ataun	1,557	1,680	1,669
Beasain	12,108	13,719	13,881
Gabiria	422	483	488
Gaintza	133	124	129
Idiazabal	2,082	2,264	2,305
Itsasondo	576	675	641
Lazkao	4,920	5,406	5,646
Legorreta	1,351	1,478	1,430
Mutiloa	158	255	252
Olaberria	904	936	945
Ordizia	8,938	9,751	10,150
Ormaiztegi	1,170	1,318	1,302
Segura	1,225	1,460	1,432
Zaldibia	1,490	1,504	1,613
Zegama	1,294	1,539	1,519
Zerain	254	266	252
Totals	38,851	43,217	44,038

== The Basque language ==
The region is traditionally Basque-speaking, having a higher proportion of Basque speakers than other comarcas in Gipuzkoa. According to data from 1996, around half the population of Goierri speak Basque as a mother tongue. The predominant dialect is the central dialect that proliferates much of Gipuzkoa's Basque speaking communities. Villages are more likely to be predominantly Basque-speaking with particularly strong Basque-speaking populations in the towns of Ordizia, Ataun, Lazkao and Beasain. Basque is the dominant language in education in the area, for example, Lazkao's San Benito Ikastola and Ataun San Martin's Joxemigel Barandiaran Eskola teaching exclusively through the Basque language with the exception of Spanish lessons.
