= Segura, Gipuzkoa =

Segura
- Municipality
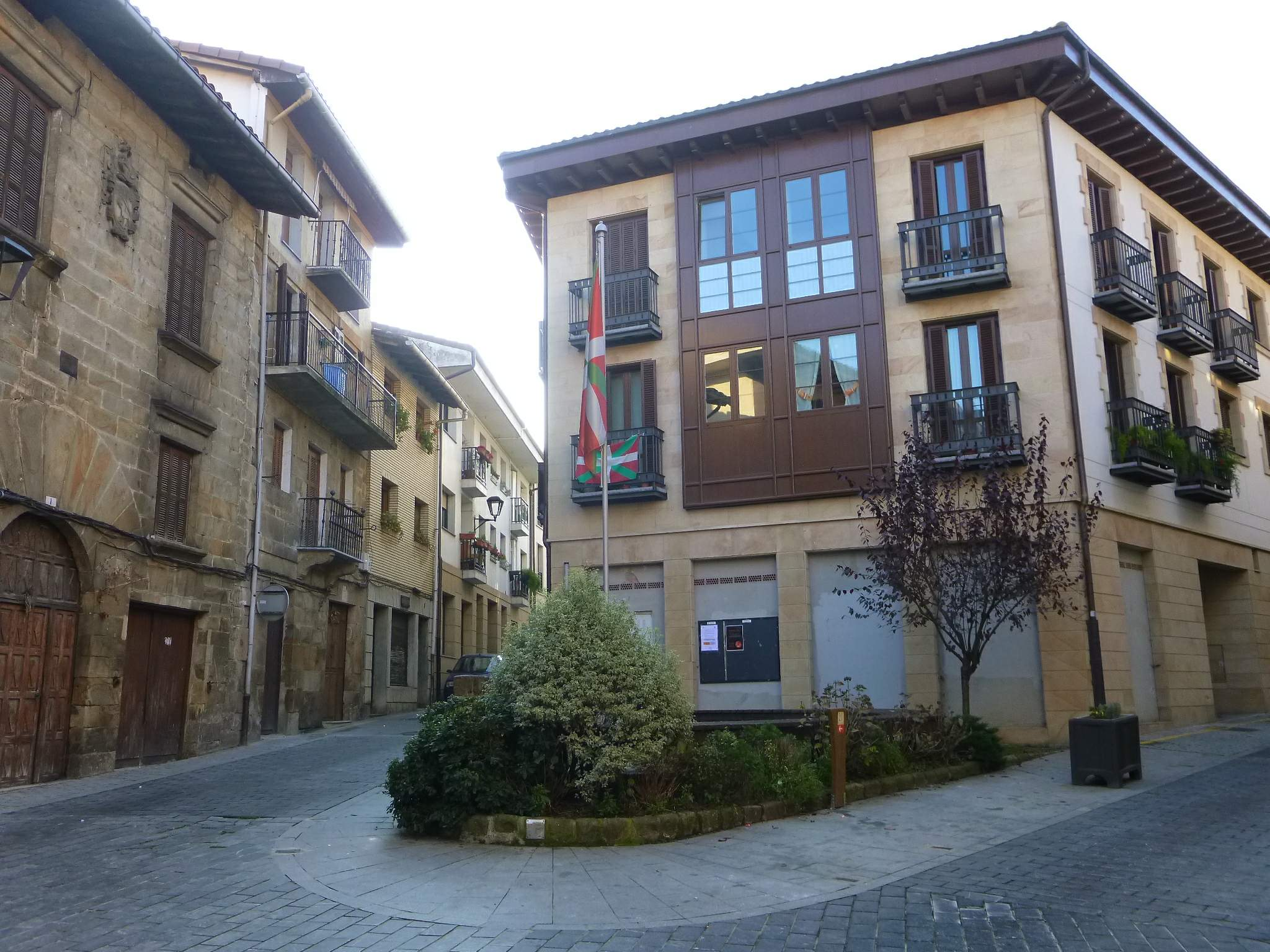

- Coat of arms

- Location of Segura within the Basque Country Location of Segura within Spain
- Coordinates: 43°00′33″N 2°15′10″W
- Country: Spain
- Autonomous community: Basque Country
- Province: Gipuzkoa
- Comarca: Goierri

Government
  - Mayor: Eluska Gerriko Fariñas

Area
  - Total: 9 km^{2} (3.5 sq mi)
- Elevation: 240 m (790 ft)

Population (2025-01-01)
  - Total: 1,496
  - Density: 170/km^{2} (430/sq mi)
- Time zone: UTC+1 (CET)
  - Summer (DST): UTC+2 (CEST)
- Postal code: 20214
- Website: www.segura.eus/

Segura is a small town and municipality in the Goierri region of the province of Gipuzkoa in the autonomous community of the Basque Country in northern Spain.
