= Altzaga =

Coordinates: 43°3′51″N 2°9′17″W

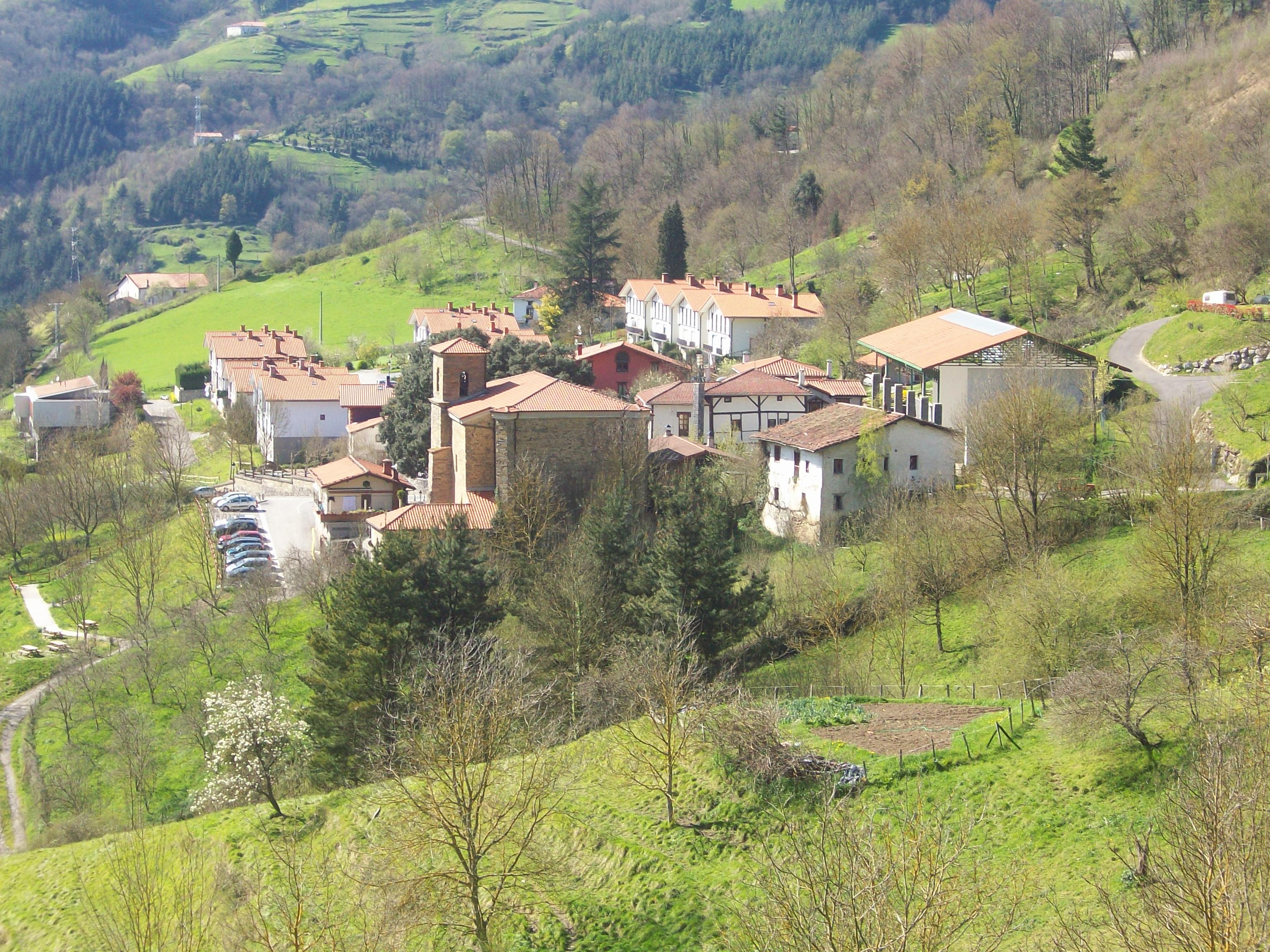
- View of Altzaga

- Coat of arms

- Location in Spain.
- Country: Spain
- Autonomous community: Gipuzkoa

Area
  - Total: 2.52 km^{2} (0.97 sq mi)

Population (2025-01-01)
  - Total: 165
  - Density: 65.5/km^{2} (170/sq mi)
- Time zone: UTC+1 (CET)
  - Summer (DST): UTC+2 (CEST)
- Website: www.altzaga.net

Altzaga is a town located in the Goierri region of the province of Gipuzkoa, in the autonomous community of the Basque Country, in the north of Spain. As of 2014 Altzaga had a total population of 165.
