= Jesús María Caínzos Fernández =

Spanish businessperson

Jesús María Caínzos Fernández is a Spanish businessperson. He is chairman of JM Caínzos & Asociados, a European consulting firm that specializes in strategy and corporate deals (mergers and acquisitions). He is also a member of the board of the IC-A (Institute of Directors) and chairman of its Professional Regulations Committee. He is a member of the board of the Forum for the Protection of the Minority Shareholders and a member of the Experts Committee formed by the Spanish Government to create the new Corporate Governance Code for listed companies.

Caínzos has been vice chairman of BBVA (Banco Bilbao Vizcaya Argentaria), vice chairman of its executive committee, and chairman of the Risk Committee. He had been European president of Johnson & Johnson and president and CEO of Janssen Pharmaceutica in Spain.

He holds a degree in Economics for the Complutense University of Madrid and several postgraduate studies at INSEAD, Northwestern University, Wharton School of the University of Pennsylvania, Harvard University and London Business School.
