= Gaviria =

Gaviria is a Spanish surname of Basque origin, derived from the town of Gabiria in the Gipuzkoa province of Spain. Notable people with the surname include:

- Alejandro Gaviria Uribe (born 1966), Colombian economist and politician
- Alfonso Araújo Gaviria (1902–1961), Colombian lawyer and diplomat
- Aníbal Gaviria Correa (born 1966), Colombian politician
- Carlos Gaviria Díaz (1937–2015), Colombian lawyer and politician
- César Gaviria Trujillo (born 1947), Former President of Colombia
- Iván Duque Gaviria (1955–2019), Colombian prisoner and former paramilitary leader
- Fernando Gaviria, (born 1994), Colombian professional road and track racing cyclist
- Guillermo Gaviria Correa (1962–2003), Colombian politician
- Hermán Gaviria Carvajal (1969–2002), Colombian footballer
- Inés Gaviria (born 1979), Colombian singer-songwriter
- Juliana Gaviria Rendon (born 1991), Colombian Olympic cyclist
- Julio Edgar Gaviria Arenas (1945–2009), Colombian footballer
- Margarita Vargas Gaviria (born 1971), Colombian singer
- Pablo Escobar Gaviria (1949–1993), Colombian drug lord and narcoterrorist
- Robeiro Moreno Gaviria (born 1969), Colombian footballer
- Simón Gaviria Muñoz (born 1980), Colombian economist and politician
- Víctor Gaviria González (born 1955), Colombian film director

== See also ==
- Gabiria, town and municipality in Gipuzkoa, Basque Country, Spain
- César Gaviria Trujillo Viaduct, cable-stayed bridge connecting the neighbouring cities of Pereira and Dosquebradas in Risaralda, Colombia
