= Legorreta, Spain =

Legorreta
- Municipality
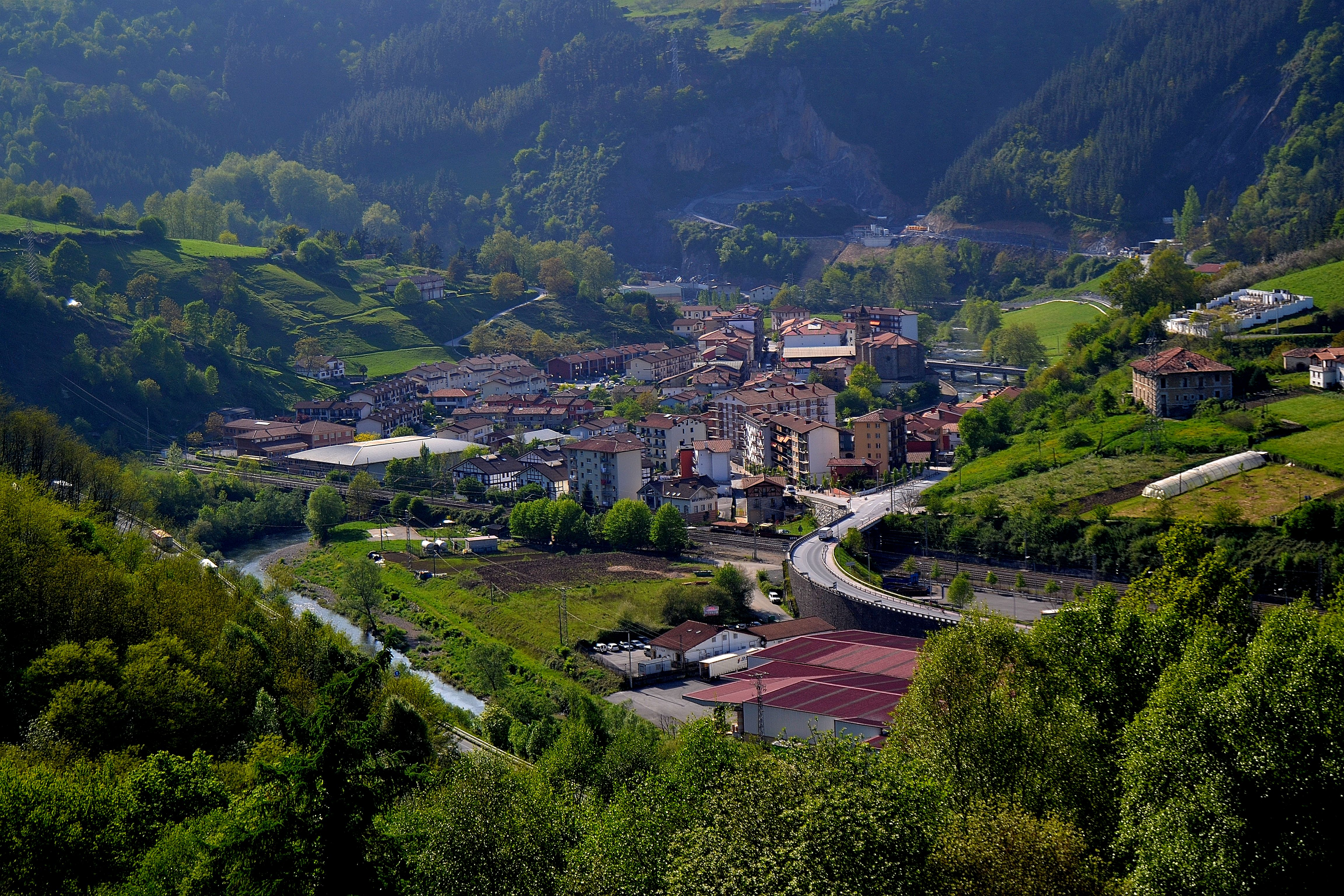

- Location of Legorreta within the Basque Autonomous Community
- Coordinates: 43°05′06″N 2°08′55″W
- Country: Spain
- Autonomous community: Basque Country
- Province: Gipuzkoa
- Eskualdea: Goierri

Government
  - Mayor: Zelai Amenabarro Goikoetxea (EH Bildu)

Area
  - Total: 8.62 km^{2} (3.33 sq mi)
- Elevation: 115 m (377 ft)

Population (2025-01-01)
  - Total: 1,457
  - Density: 169/km^{2} (438/sq mi)
- Time zone: UTC+1 (GMT)
  - Summer (DST): UTC+2 (GMT)
- Website: https://www.legorreta.eus/

Legorreta is a town and municipality located in the Goierri region of the province of Gipuzkoa, in the autonomous community of the Basque Country, northern Spain.
