= Gaintza =

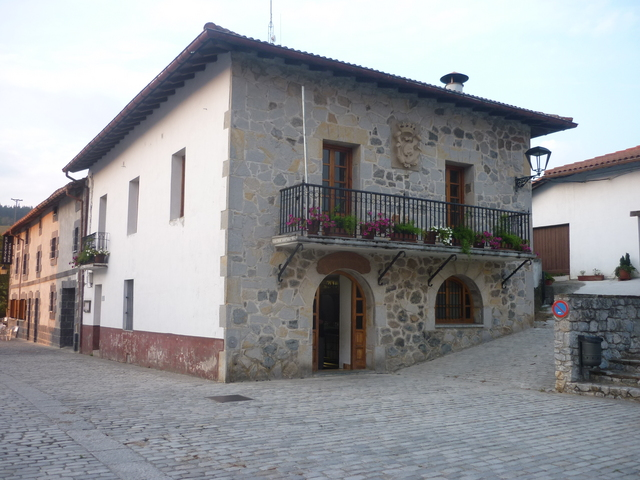
- Gaintza Town Square

- Coat of arms

- Location of Gaintza within the Basque Country
- Coordinates: 43°3′11″N 2°07′57″W
- Country: Spain
- Autonomous Community: Basque Country
- Province: Gipuzkoa
- Comarca: Goierri

Government
  - Mayor: Joseba Mirene Garmendia Ustoa

Area
  - Total: 5.96 km^{2} (2.30 sq mi)

Population (2025-01-01)
  - Total: 122
  - Density: 20.5/km^{2} (53.0/sq mi)
- Time zone: UTC+1 (CET)
  - Summer (DST): UTC+2 (CEST)
- Postal code: 20248
- Website: www.gaintza.net

Gaintza is a town and municipality located in the Goierri region of the province of Gipuzkoa, in the autonomous community of the Basque Country, northern Spain.
