= Gabiria =

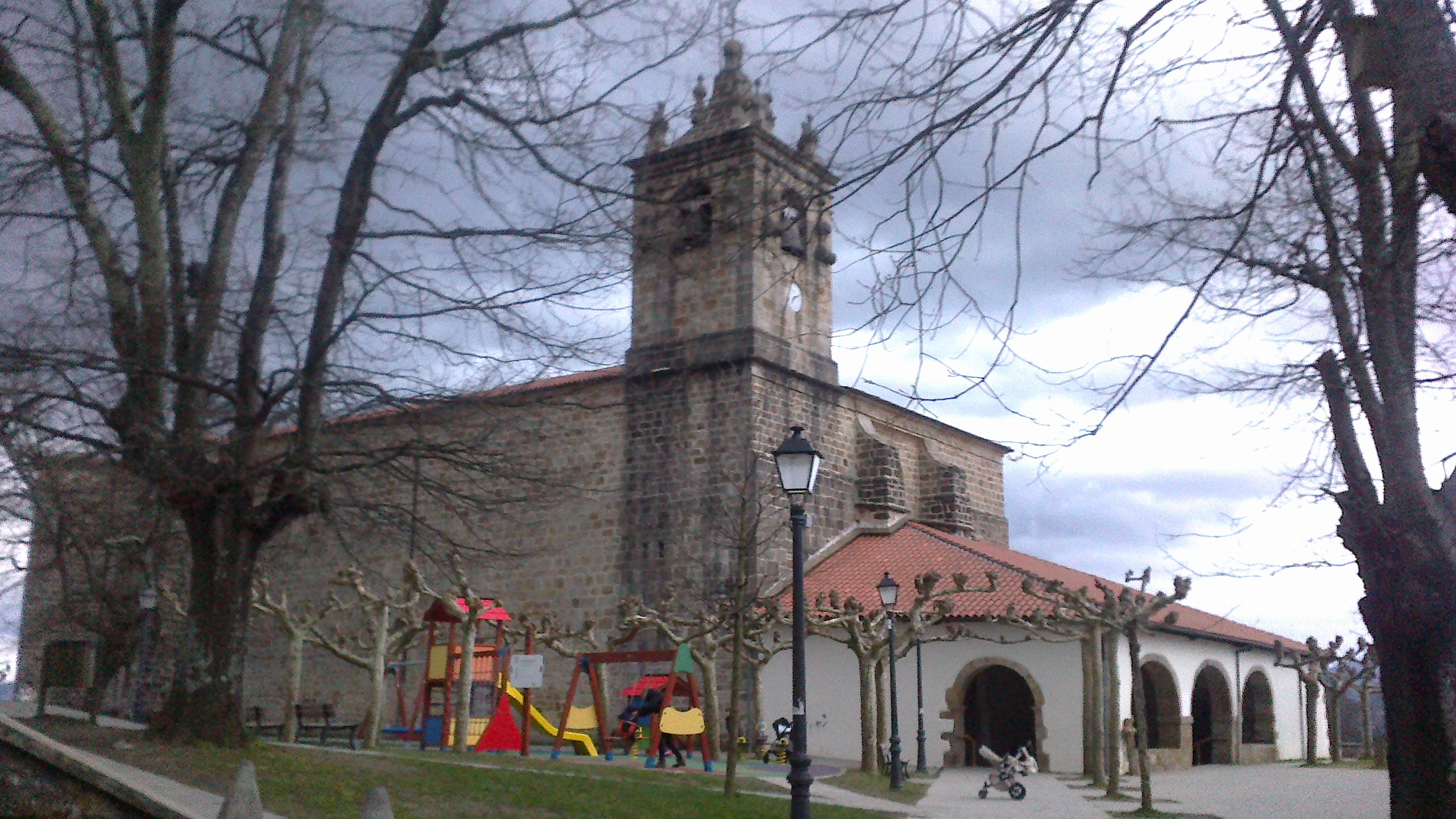
- Church of Gabiria

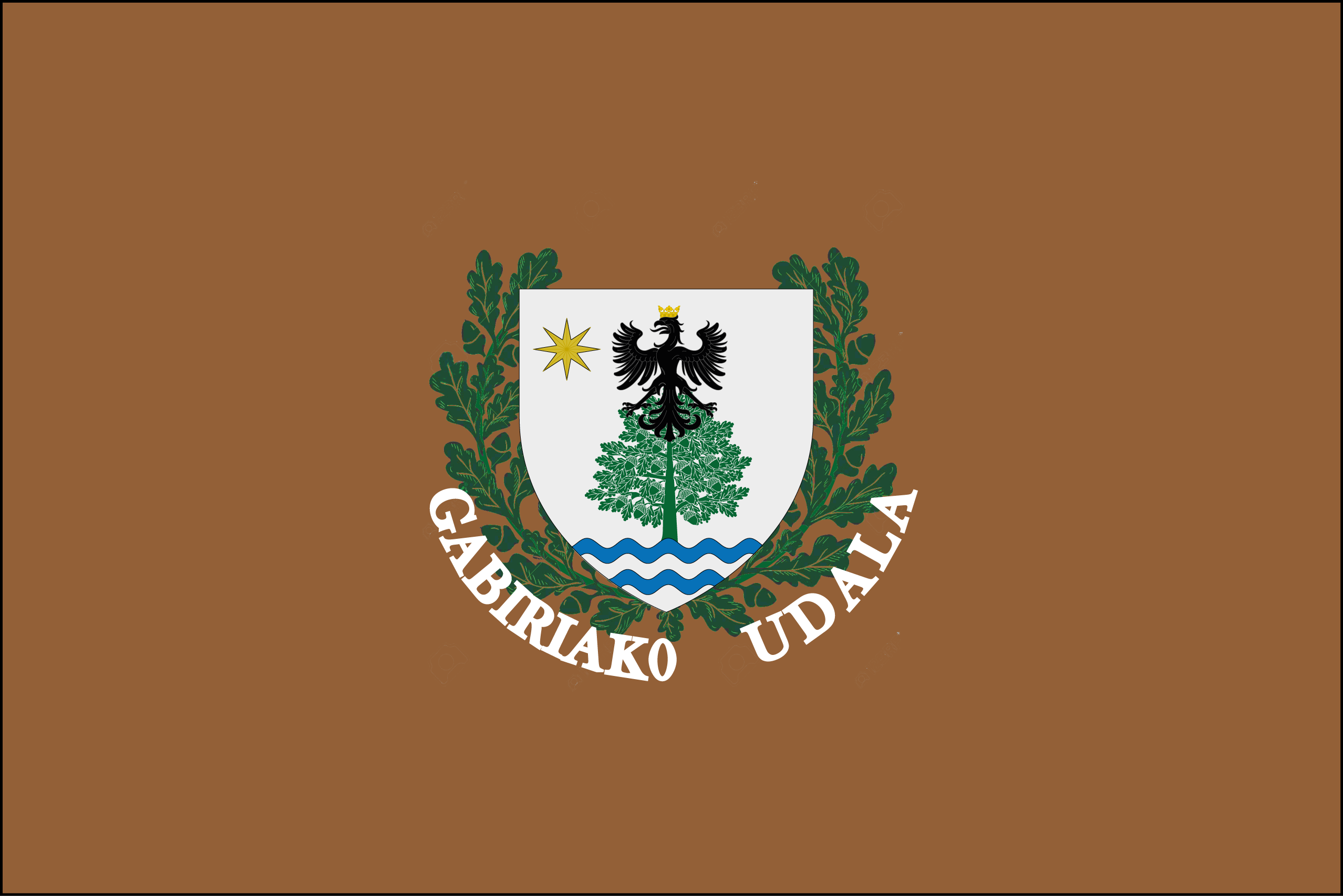
- Flag Coat of arms

- Location of Gabiria within the Basque Country Location of Gabiria within Spain
- Coordinates: 43°03′01″N 2°16′45″W
- Country: Spain
- Autonomous community: Basque Country
- Province: Gipuzkoa
- Comarca: Goierri

Government
  - Mayor: Ibon Elgarresta Asurabarrena

Area
  - Total: 15 km^{2} (5.8 sq mi)
- Elevation: 414 m (1,358 ft)

Population (2025-01-01)
  - Total: 519
  - Density: 35/km^{2} (90/sq mi)
- Time zone: UTC+1 (CET)
  - Summer (DST): UTC+2 (CEST)
- Postal code: 20217
- Website: www.gabiria.eus

Gabiria is a town and municipality located in the region of Goierri of the province of Gipuzkoa, in the autonomous community of the Basque Country, northern Spain.
