= Beasain =

- Municipality
- Beasain
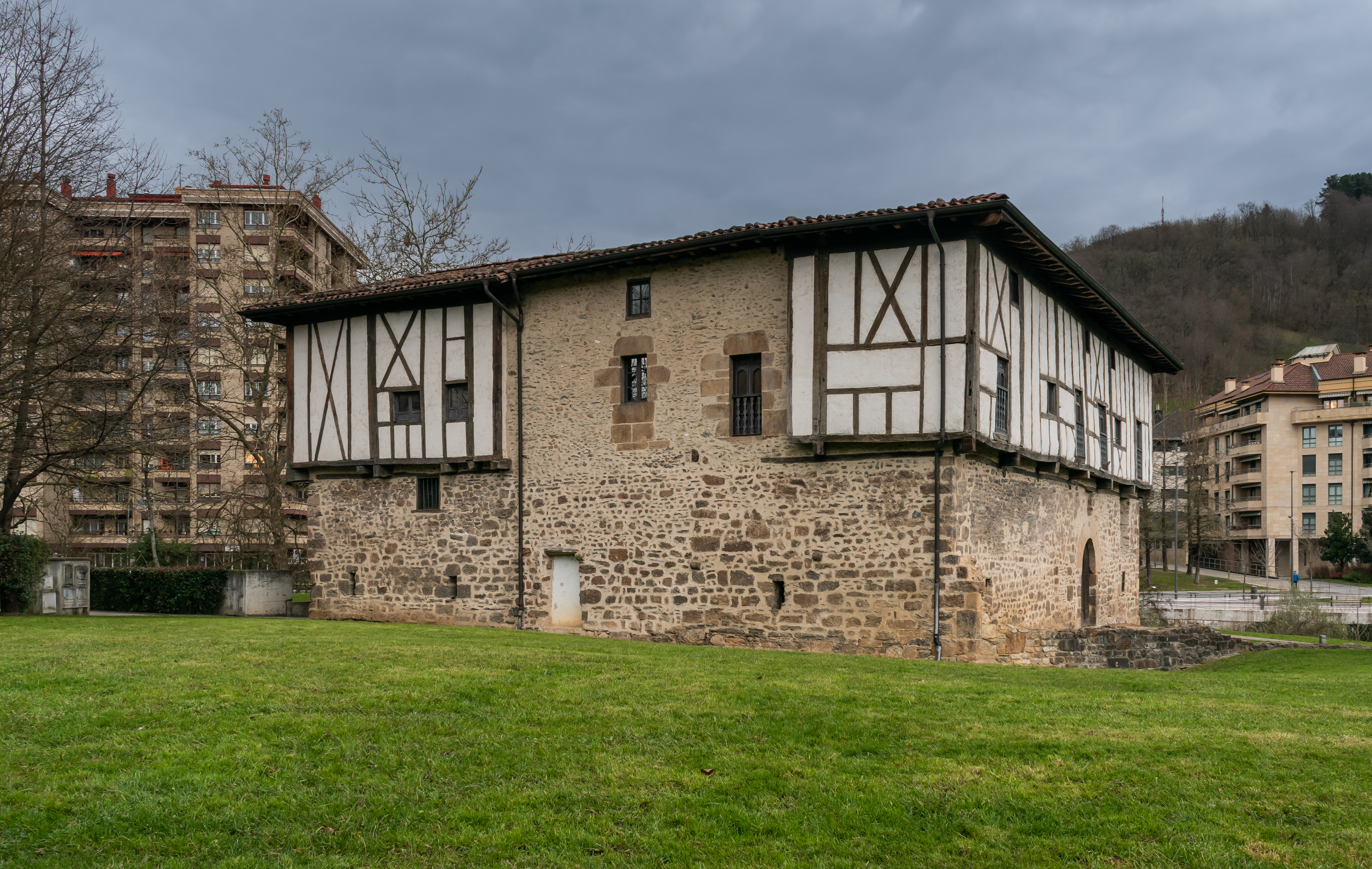
- Igartza Palace in Beasain

- Coat of arms

- Location of Beasain within the Basque Country and within Spain Beasain (Spain)
- Coordinates: 43°02′45″N 2°11′22″W
- Country: Spain
- Autonomous Community: Basque Country
- Province: Gipuzkoa
- Eskualdea: Goierri
- Founded: 1615

Government
  - Type: City Council
  - Mayor: Aitor Aldasoro Iturbe (PNV)

Area
  - Total: 30.02 km^{2} (11.59 sq mi)

Population (2025-01-01)
  - Total: 14,048
  - Density: 468.0/km^{2} (1,212/sq mi)
- Time zone: CET (GMT +1)
  - Summer (DST): CEST (GMT +2)
- Post code: 20200
- Area code: +34 943
- Website: www.beasain.eus

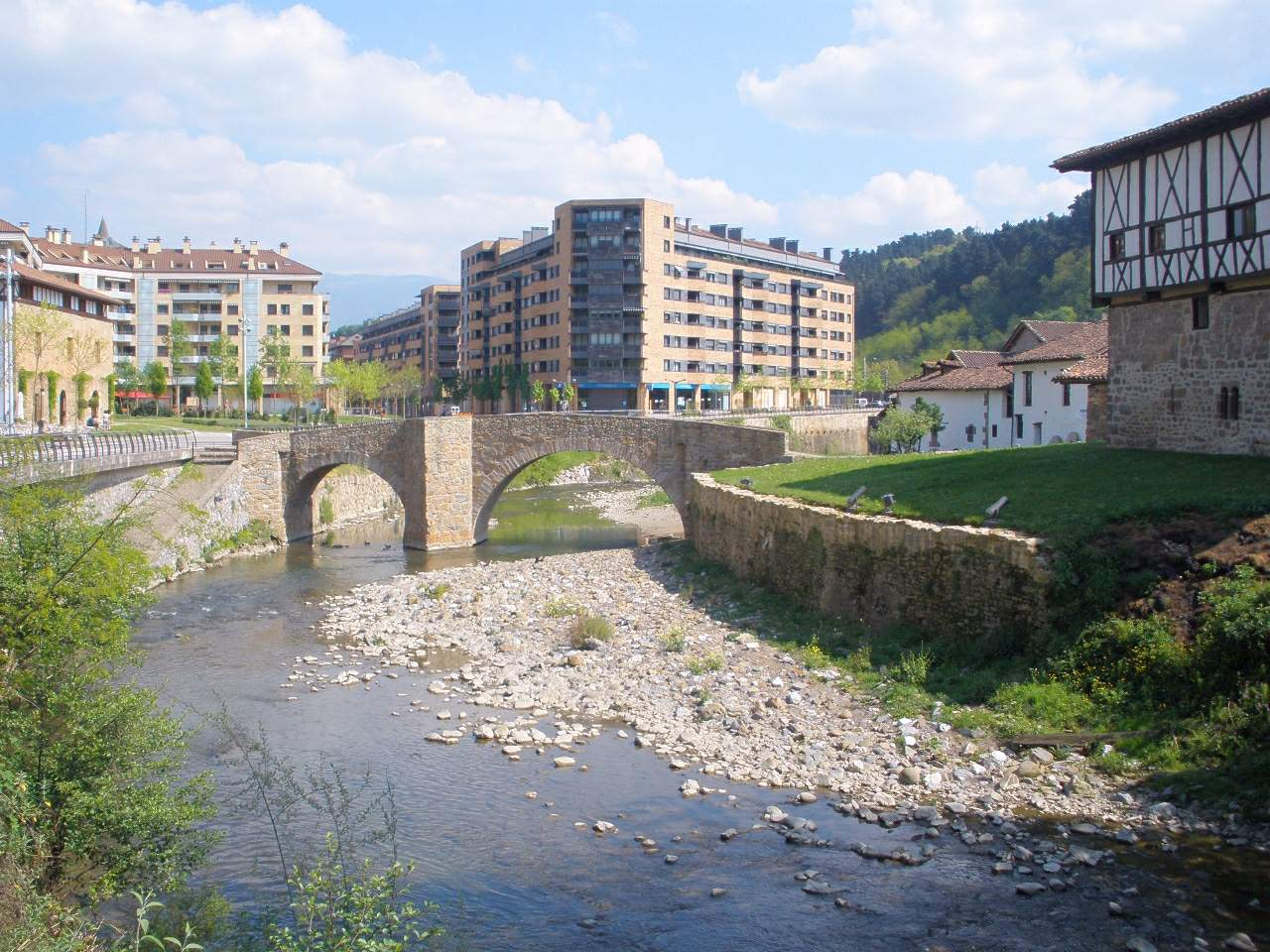
Beasain upon the river Oria

Beasain is a town and municipality located in the Goierri region of the province of Gipuzkoa, in the Autonomous Community of the Basque Country, northern Spain. It has an important industry of railway vehicles and related equipment (CAF) that exports its production around the world.

In 2015 it had a population of 13,980 inhabitants.

== Notable people ==
- Karlos Arguiñano (born September 6, 1948) is a Spanish chef.
- Pako Ayestarán (born 5 February 1963) is a Spanish football manager, former Head Coach of Valencia CF.
- Gorka Elustondo (born 18 March 1987) is a Spanish football player, currently playing for Rayo Vallecano
