= Zaldibia =

Coordinates: 43°2′11″N 2°8′59″W

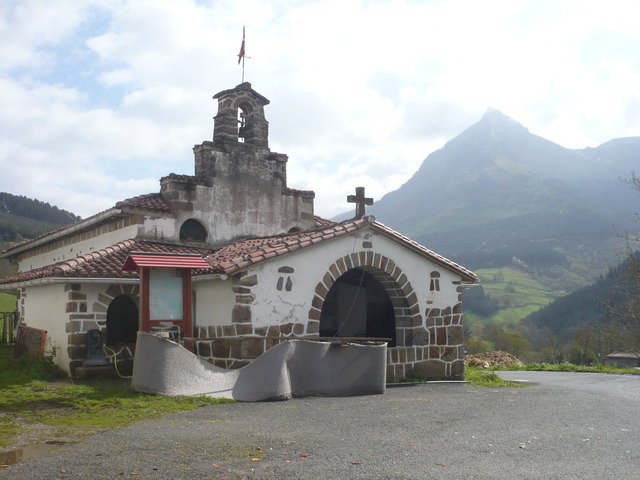
Hermitage of Saturdi in Zaldibia

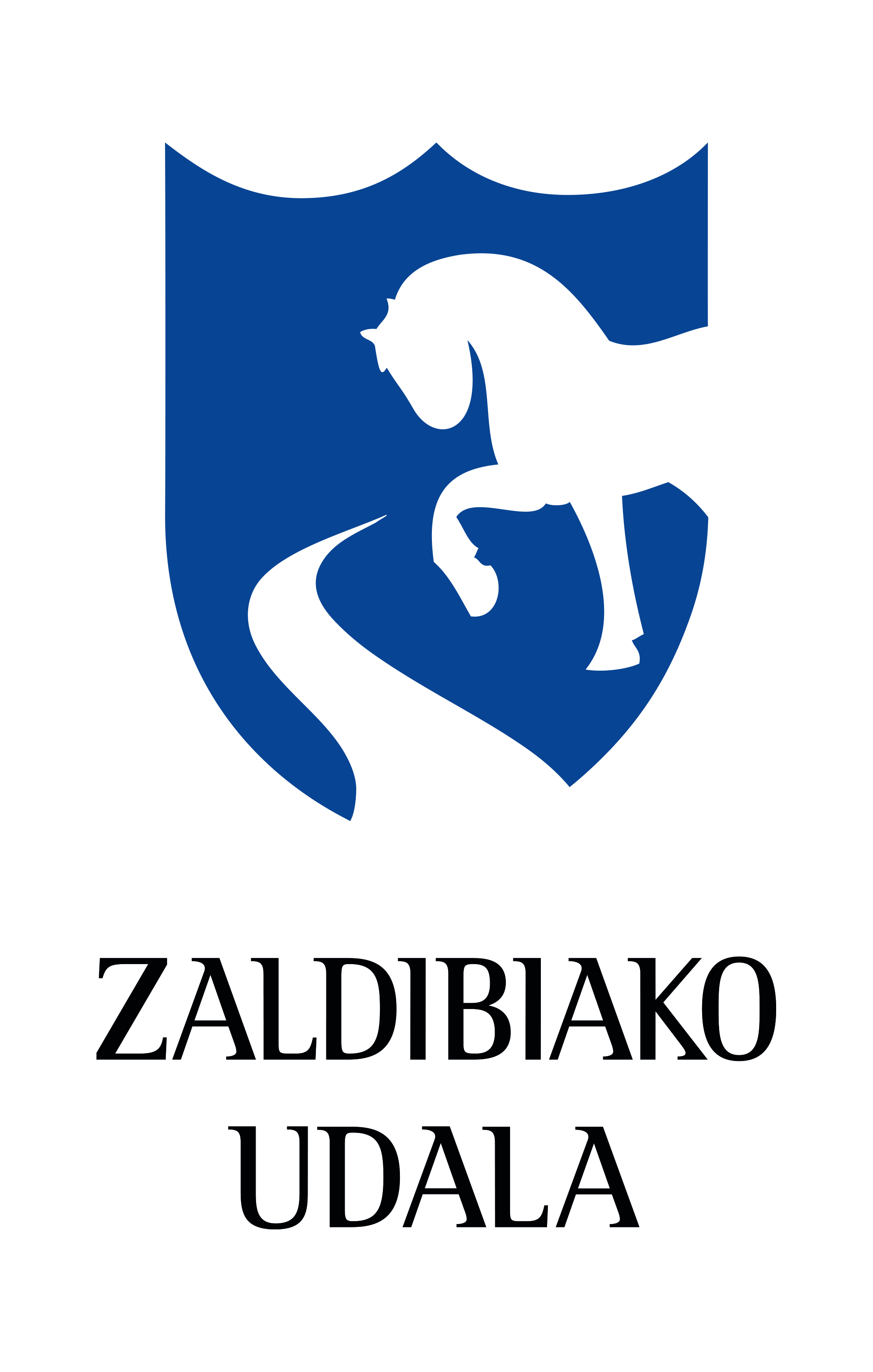
Zaldibia's coat of arms

Zaldibia (Spanish: Zaldivia) is a town and municipality in the Goierri region of the province of Gipuzkoa, in the Basque Country.
