= Itsasondo =

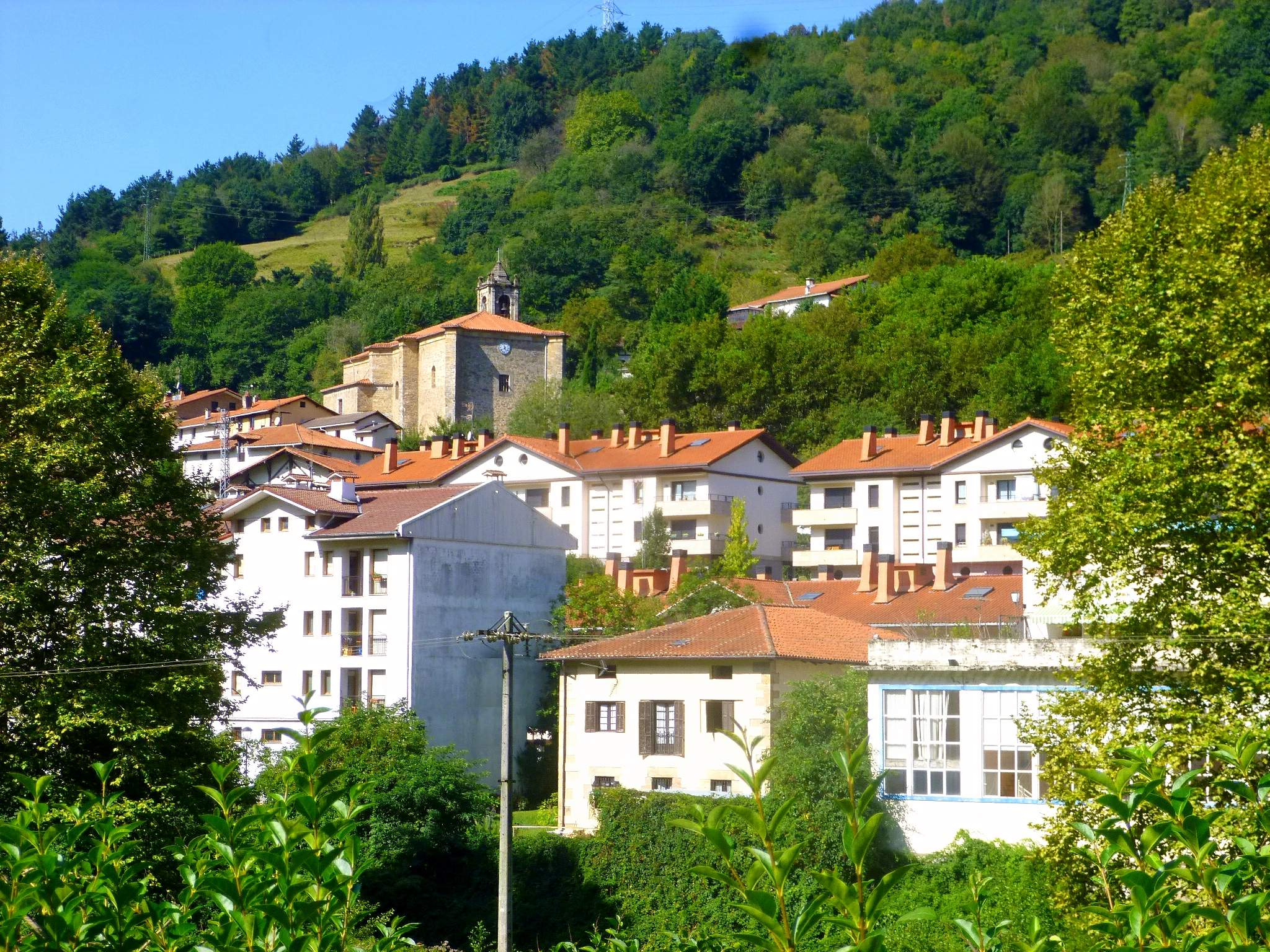
- Itsasondo

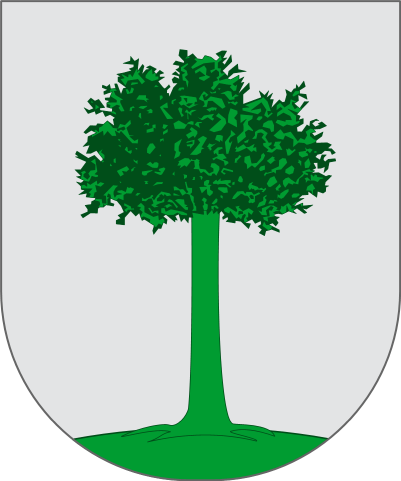
- Coat of arms

- Location in Spain
- Coordinates: 43°04′04″N 2°10′02″W
- Country: Spain
- Autonomous Community: Basque Country
- Province: Gipuzkoa
- Comarca: Goierri

Area
  - Total: 8.94 km^{2} (3.45 sq mi)

Population (2025-01-01)
  - Total: 687
  - Density: 76.8/km^{2} (199/sq mi)
- Time zone: UTC+1 (CET)
  - Summer (DST): UTC+2 (CEST)
- Website: www.itsasondo.eus

Itsasondo is a town and municipality located in the Goierri region of the province of Gipuzkoa, in the autonomous community of the Basque Country, northern Spain.
