= Olaberria =

- Municipality
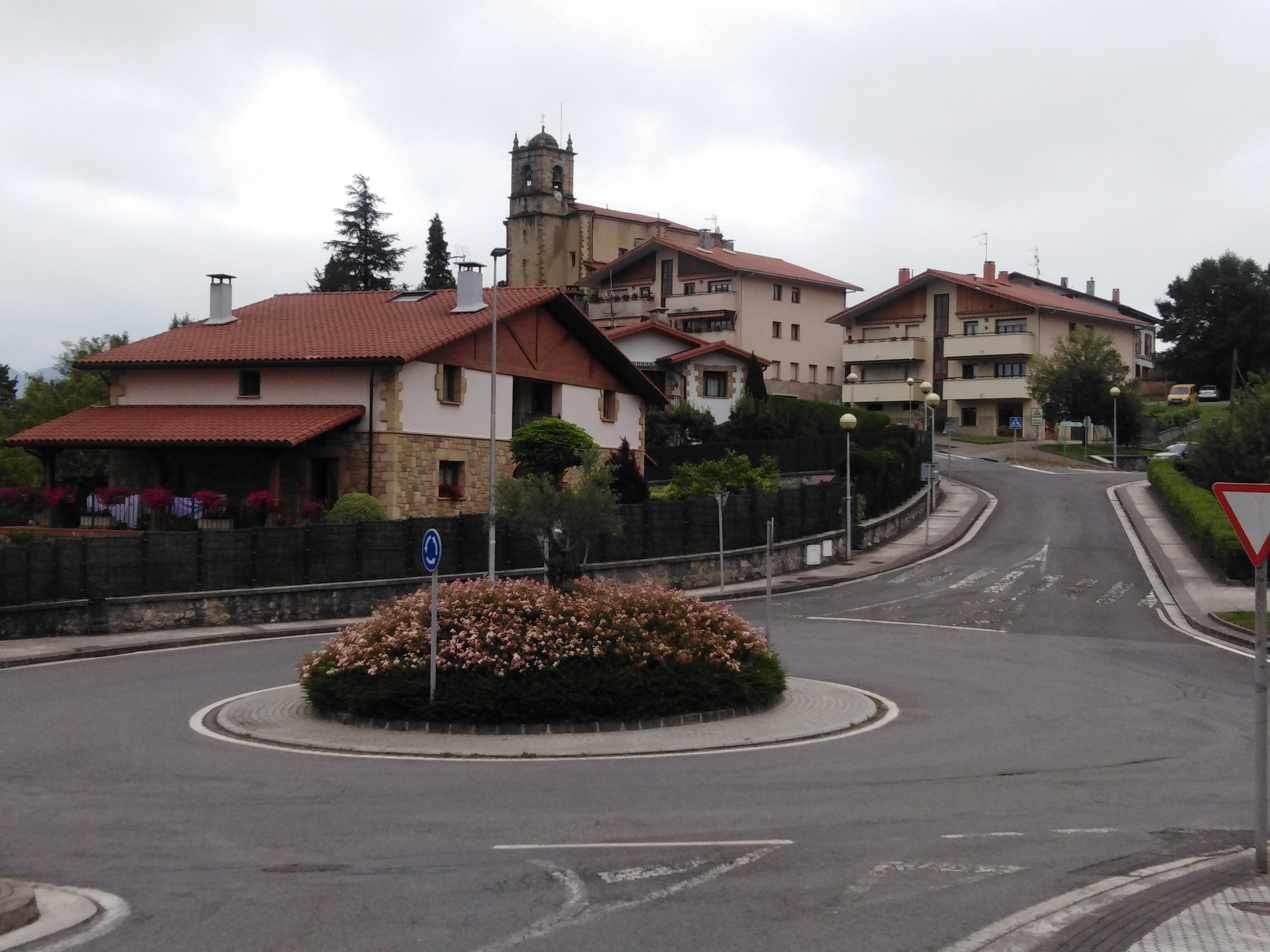

- Flag Coat of arms

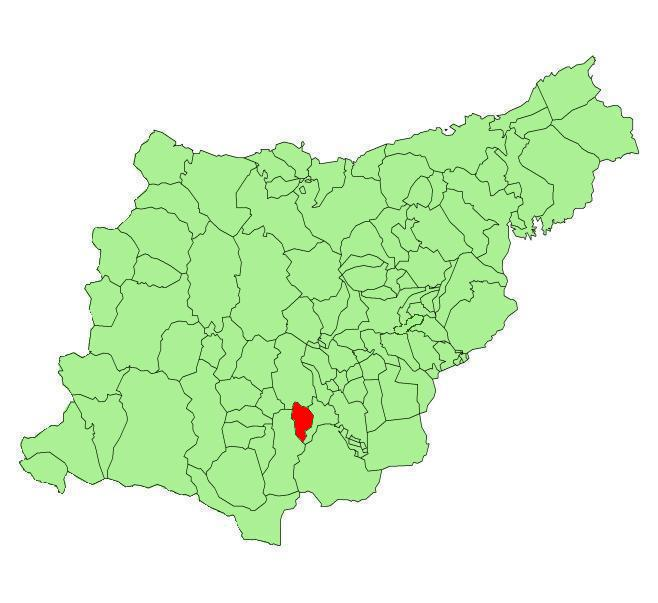
- Location in Gipuzkoa

- Location of Olaberria within the Basque Autonomous Community
- Coordinates: 43°01′37″N 2°12′13″W
- Country: Spain
- Autonomous community: Basque Country
- Province: Gipuzkoa
- Eskualdea: Goierri

Area
  - Total: 8.62 km^{2} (3.33 sq mi)
- Elevation: 342 m (1,122 ft)

Population (2025-01-01)
  - Total: 938
  - Density: 109/km^{2} (282/sq mi)
- Time zone: UTC+1 (GMT)
  - Summer (DST): UTC+2 (GMT)
- Postal code: 20212
- Website: https://www.olaberria.eus/

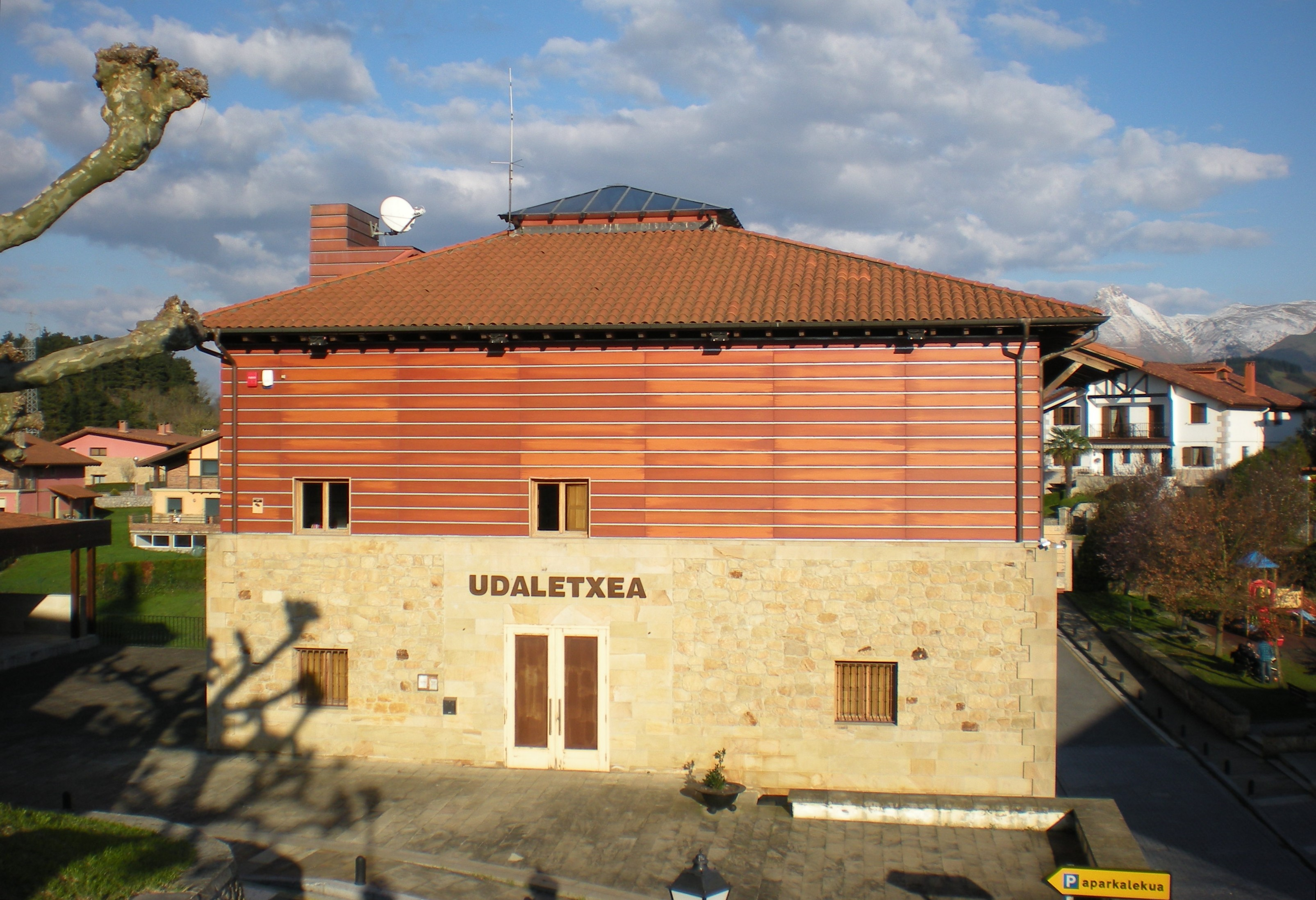
Olaberria city hall

Olaberria is a town and municipality located in the Goierri region of the province of Gipuzkoa, in the autonomous community of the Basque Country, northern Spain.
