= Idiazabal =

- Municipality
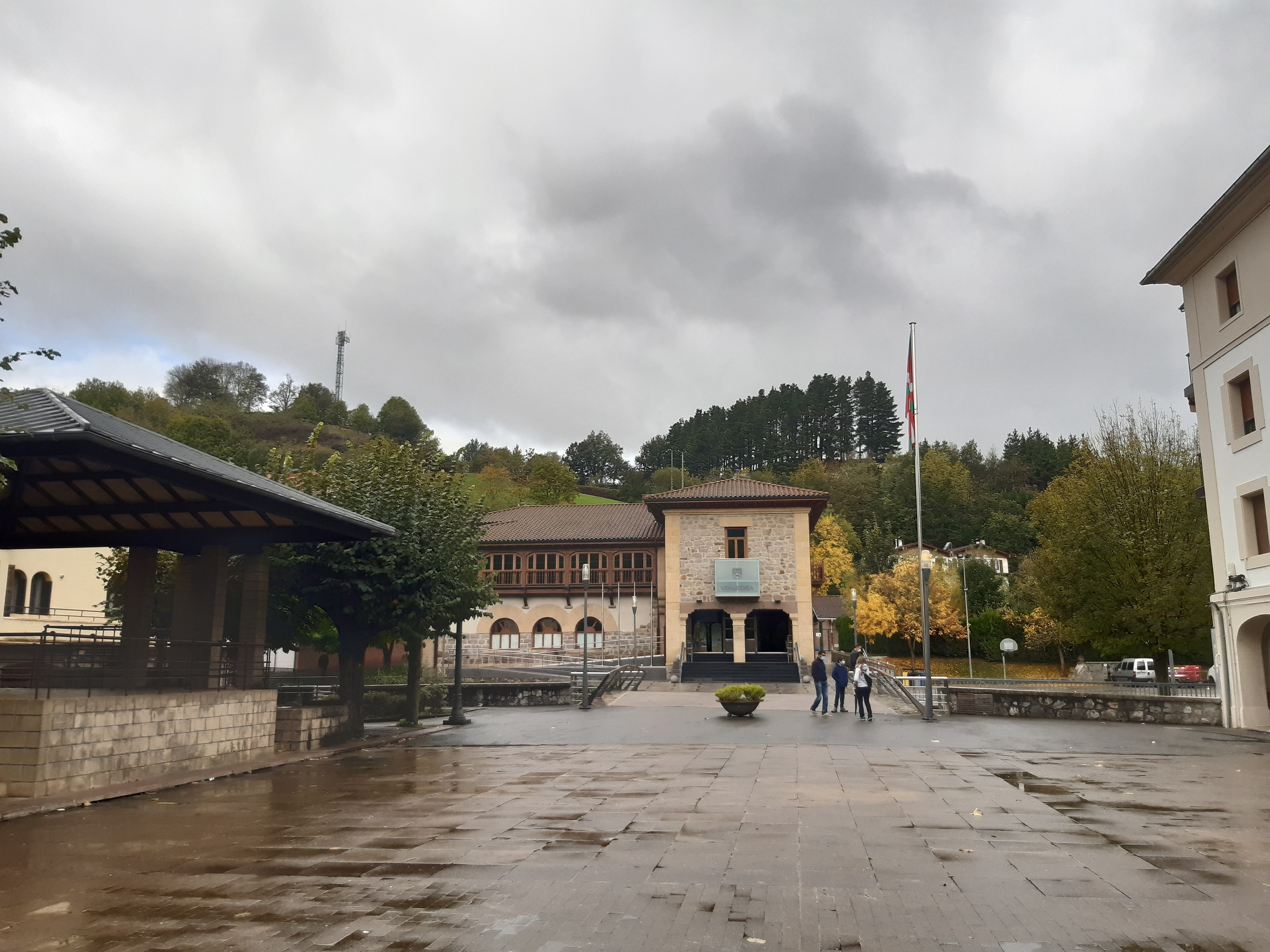
- Town square with the town hall

- Flag Coat of arms

- Location of Idiazabal within the Basque Autonomous Community Idiazabal (Spain)
- Coordinates: 43°00′38″N 2°14′01″W
- Country: Spain
- Autonomous community: Basque Country
- Province: Gipuzkoa
- Eskualdea: Goierri
- Founded: 1615

Government
  - Mayor: Iñaki Alberdi (EH Bildu)

Area
  - Total: 29.47 km^{2} (11.38 sq mi)
- Elevation: 210 m (690 ft)

Population (2025-01-01)
  - Total: 2,217
  - Density: 75.23/km^{2} (194.8/sq mi)
- Demonym: Basque: idiazabaldar
- Time zone: UTC+1 (CET)
  - Summer (DST): UTC+2 (CEST)
- Postal code: 20213
- Website: Official website

Idiazabal is a town and municipality in the Goierri region of the province of Gipuzkoa, in the autonomous community of the Basque Country, northern Spain.

The area has given its name to the renowned Idiazabal cheese of the region, one of the best-known products of the Basque cuisine.
