= Urrutia =

Urrutia (with a French Basque variant, Urruty), meaning "distant, far away" in Basque (also known as Euskera) is the name of a family that originated in Zumárraga in the province of Gipuzkoa, and then spread out throughout the Basque country, and eventually throughout the Americas (South, Central, and North) and the Philippines.

== People with the name ==
- Abraham Oyanedel Urrutia (1874–1954), Chilean politician and jurist
- Alfonso Hortiz de Urrutia (1455–1503), Spanish humanist writer
- Aliecer Urrutia (born 1974), Cuban athlete
- Ana Gertrudis de Urrutia Garchitorena (1812–1850), Spanish painter
- Aureliano Urrutia (1871–1975), Mexican physician and politician
- Benjamin Urrutia, Ecuadorian-American writer
- Carlos Luis de Urrutia, 19th-century governor of Santo Domingo
- Diego Dublé Urrutia, Chilean poet and diplomat
- Edmundo González Urrutia, Venezuelan politician
- Enrique Alvear Urrutia, Chilean bishop
- Estíbaliz Urrutia, Spanish long-distance runner
- Francisco de Paula Urrutia Ordóñez, Colombian diplomat
- Francisco José Urrutia Olano, Colombian diplomat
- Francisco José Urrutia Holguín, Colombian diplomat and jurist
- Henry Urrutia (born 1987), Cuban baseball player
- Iban Zubiaurre Urrutia, Spaniard footballer
- Ignacio Bolivar y Urrutia (1850–1944), Spaniard naturalist and entomologist
- Ignacio Jose Urrutia, Cuban historian
- Ignacio Urrutia Manzano, Chilean politician
- Ilma Urrutia, Guatemalan beauty pageant contestant
- Jenaro de Urrutia Olaran, Basque painter
- Jorge Urrutia, Chilean composer
- Jorge Urrutia, Mexican mathematician
- José Antonio Gómez Urrutia (born 1953), Chilean lawyer and politician
- José de Urrutia, Tejano military
- Josu Urrutia, Spaniard footballer
- Juan Antonio de Urrutia y Arana, Mexican nobleman and patron of the arts
- Karla Urrutia (born 1994), Mexican squash player
- Luis Gilberto Murillo Urrutia (born 1967), Colombian engineer and politician
- Manuel Urrutia Lleó, 20th President of Cuba
- María Isabel Urrutia, Colombian athlete and politician
- Matilde Urrutia, wife of Pablo Neruda
- Miguel Urrutia Montoya, Colombian economist and politician
- Osmani Urrutia (born 1976), Cuban baseball player
- Patricio Urrutia, Ecuadorian footballer
- Paulina Urrutia (born 1969), Chilean actress and politician
- Pedro R. Pierluisi Urrutia (born 1959), Puerto Rican lawyer and politician
- Raúl Urrutia (born 1950), Chilean lawyer and politician
- Roberto Urrutia, Cuban American Olympic weightlifter
- Robinson Urrutia, Colombian sprinter
- Ruben Urrutia, Puerto Rican rapper
- Santiago Urrutia, Uruguayan racing driver
- Tatiana Urrutia, Chilean lawyer and politician
- Victoriano Gómez Urrutia (1943–1971), Salvadoran murderer, last prisoner to be executed by El Salvador
- Wenceslao Ramírez de Villa-Urrutia, 1st Marquis of Villa-Urrutia, Spanish noble, politician and diplomat

== See also ==
- List of Basques
- List of people with Basque ancestors
- Thomson–Urrutia Treaty, a treaty between the United States and Colombia
