= Isidro de Alaix Fábregas =

Prime Minister of Spain, general

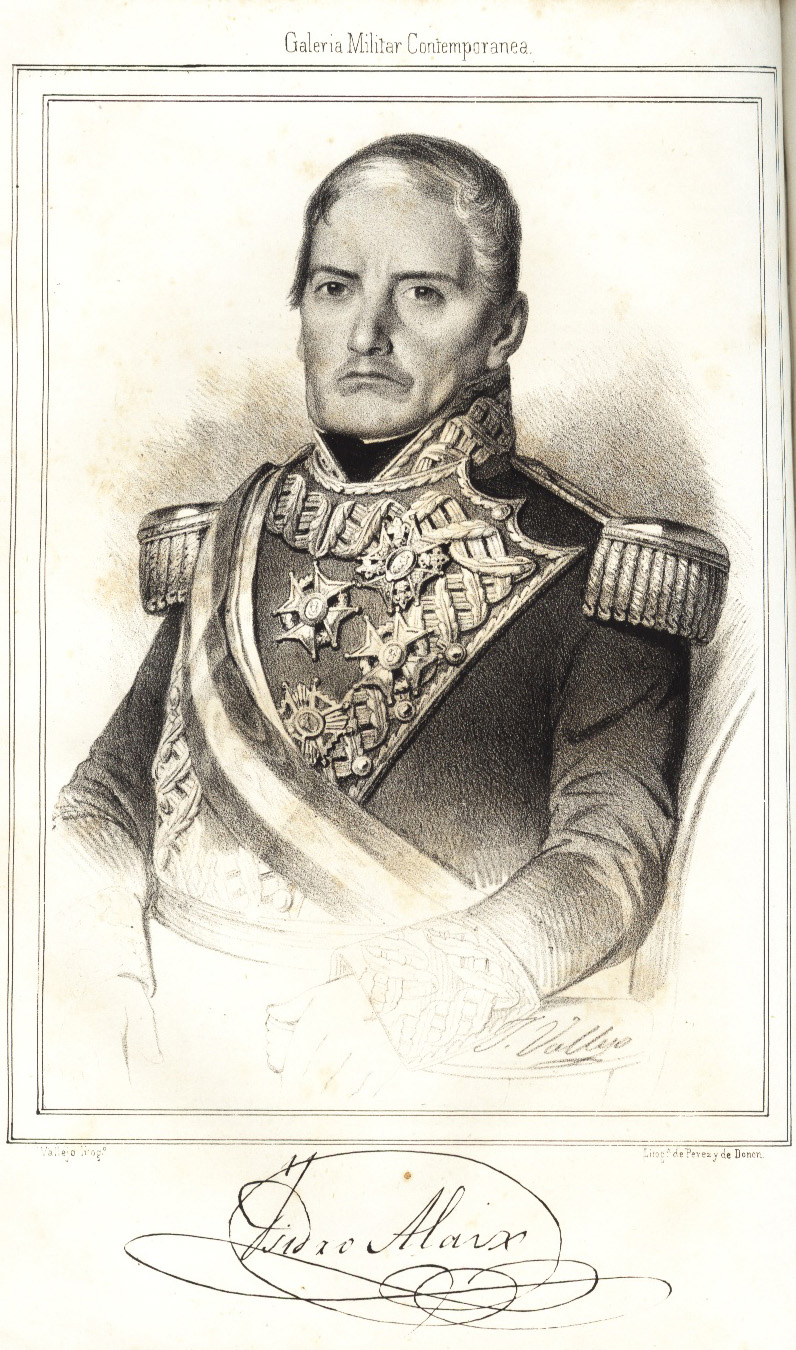
Isidro de Alaix Fábregas

Isidro de Alaix Fábregas, Count of Vergara and Viscount of Villarrobledo, (1790 in Ceuta – October 15, 1853 in Madrid) was a Spanish general of the First Carlist War, supporting the cause of the Liberals, who backed Isabella II of Spain and her regent mother Maria Christina. Born at Ceuta, Alaix fought during the Spanish War of Independence and also participated in the campaigns in South America against the independence movements there.

He inflicted a serious defeat on the Carlist general Miguel Gómez Damas at the Battle of Villarrobledo, which led to his promotion to the rank of general and the earning of the title of Viscount of Villarrobledo, as well as the Cross of Saint Ferdinand. He later served as a senator-for-life, Minister of War, and served as interim president of the Council of Ministers from December 9, 1838 to February 3, 1839 –in effect, serving as head of the Spanish government.

As Minister of War, he signed the Vergara Embrace, which ended the First Carlist War, and thereby earned the title of Count of Vergara.

He died at Madrid.
