= Villarrobledo =

- Municipality
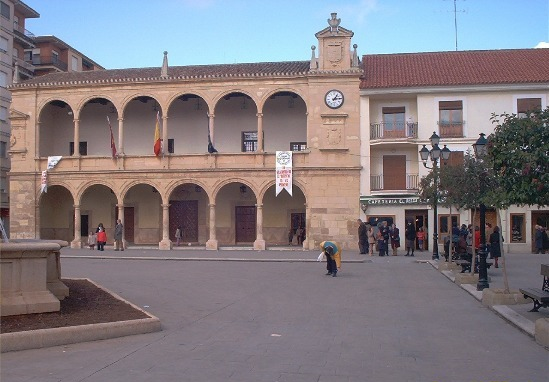
- Renaissance portico of City Hall (1599)

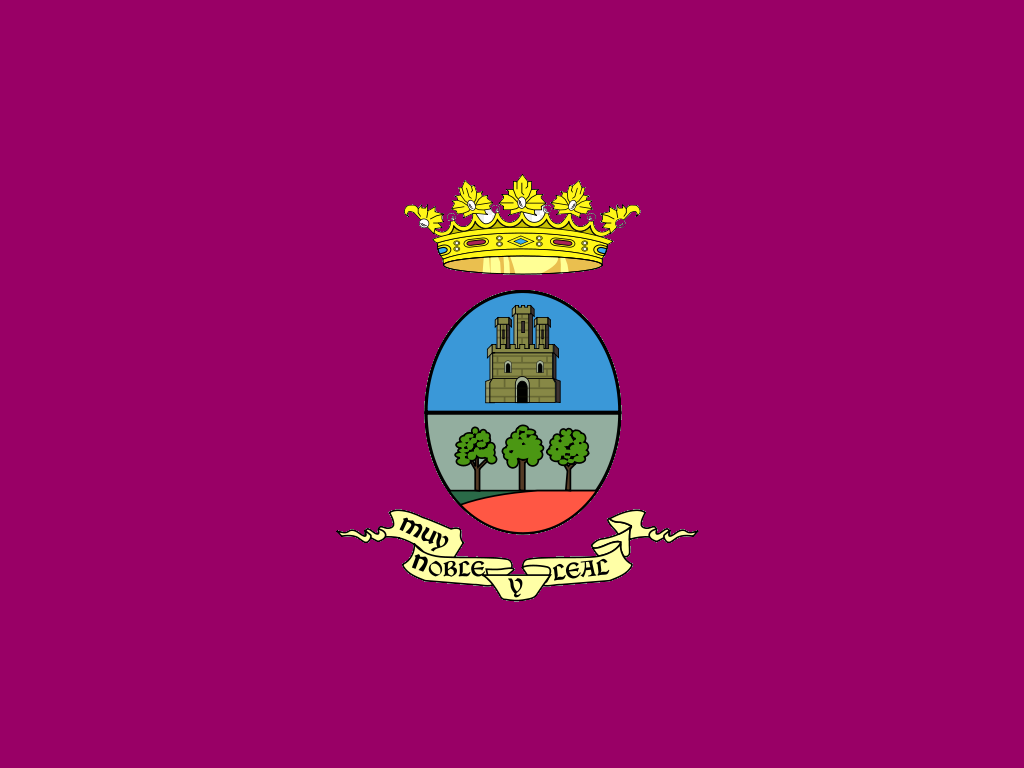
- Flag Coat of arms

- Location in Spain
- Coordinates: 39°16′0″N 2°36′0″W
- Country: Spain
- Autonomous Community: Castile-La Mancha
- Province: Albacete
- Comarca: Mancha Alta Albaceteña

Government
  - Mayor: Valentín Bueno Vargas (PP)

Area
  - Total: 862 km^{2} (333 sq mi)
- Elevation (AMSL): 721 m (2,365 ft)

Population (2025-01-01)
  - Total: 25,400
  - Density: 29.5/km^{2} (76.3/sq mi)
- Time zone: UTC+1 (CET)
  - Summer (DST): UTC+2 (CEST (GMT +2))
- Postal code: 02600
- Area code: +34 (Spain) + 967 (Albacete)
- Website: www.villarrobledo.com

Villarrobledo (Spanish pronunciation: [biʎaroˈβleðo]) is a Spanish city and municipality in the province of Albacete, part of the autonomous community of Castilla-La Mancha. It's better known for having the world's largest area covered by vineyards (more than 30,000 has., approximately 48,000,000 of vines) as well as the world's greatest production of La Mancha wine, called in Spanish Denominación de Origen. Also, it is an important center of Manchego cheese production and export and has other important industries like metallurgy and transportation.

The city celebrates a number of events, including the Carnival, the ViñaRock Music Festival, the Holy Week and the International Chess Open 'Ciudad de Villarrobledo'.

== Geography ==
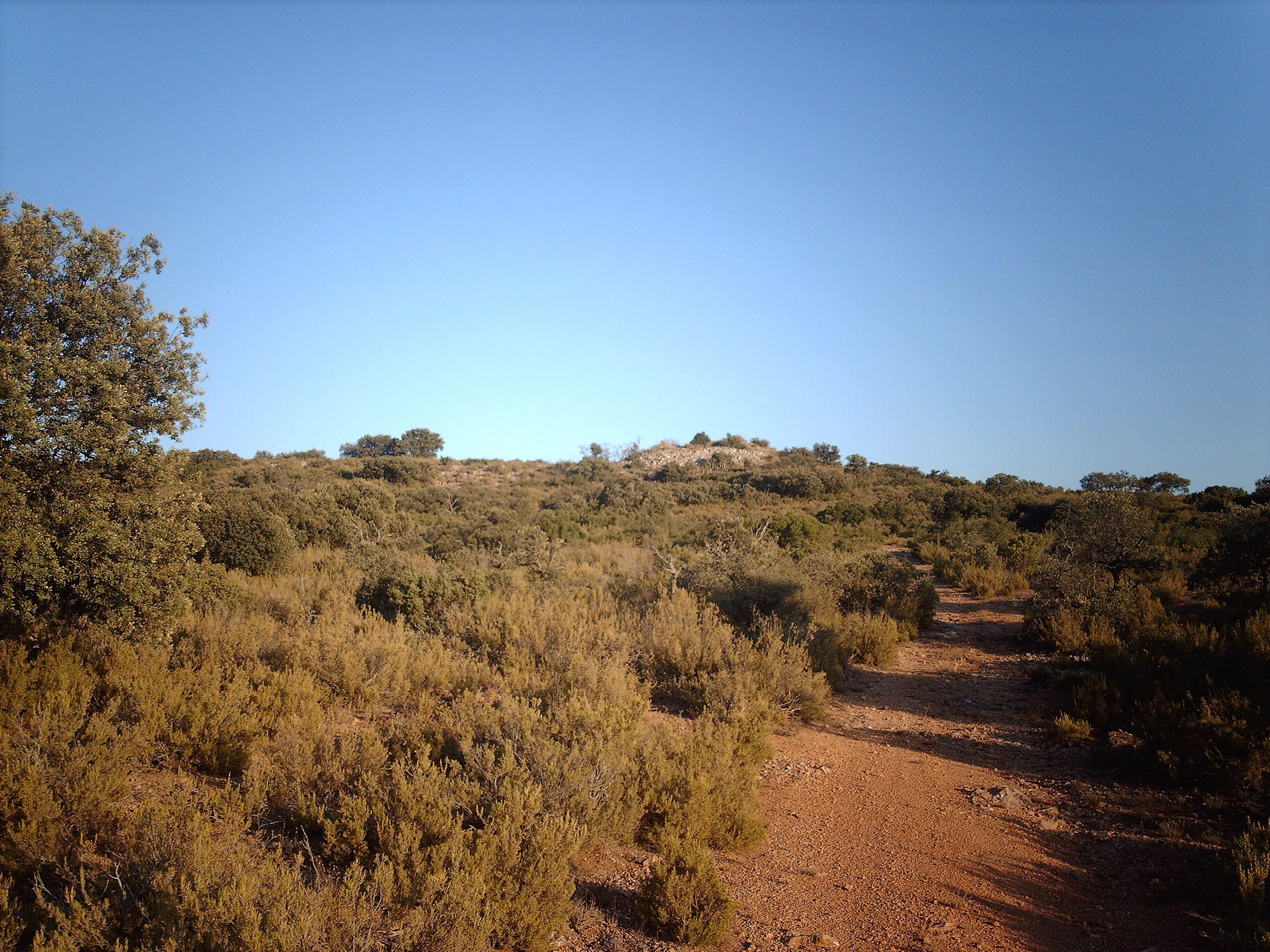
Place of La Encantada, Villarrobledo; botanical microreserve.

Villarrobledo is located in the center of La Mancha, a Spanish region with approximately 26.000 km^{2} of almost perfect plain, on the eastern half of the Submeseta Meridional with elevation between 600 and 800 meters above sea level, and bordered by the Montes de Toledo, Sierra Morena, Sierra de Alcaraz and Serranía de Cuenca.

- Altitude: 721 Msl. From 713,5 m (Railway Station) to 739 m (Era de Carrasco).
- Land area: 861,25 km^{2}, the 16th in Spain.
- Coordinates: 39°16′10″N 02°36′15″W
- Rivers: Záncara (tributary of the Guadiana river), Córcoles and Sotuélamos (both tributaries of Záncara river).

Land area limits
Direction	Limits
North	Las Mesas, Las Pedroñeras, El Provencio, San Clemente and Casas de los Pinos -Province of Cuenca-
East	Minaya, La Roda and Munera – Province of Albacete-
South	Munera, El Bonillo and Ossa de Montiel -Province of Albacete-
West	Alhambra and Socuéllamos -Province of Ciudad Real-.

== Climate ==
Villarrobledo has a climate that registers extreme temperatures: very low in winter (there have been produced values below −20°) and very high in summer (over 40°). The dominant winds are Solano (from the east) in summer, Cierzo (cold wind from the northwest) in winter and Ábrego (from the southwest) throughout the year. Regardless of these contrasts, the winter cold and the summer heat are dry. Spring and autumn are agreeable.

2005 CLIMATIC DATA (Juanaco place's observatory)
MONTH	MAT (date) Maximum absolute temperature	mat (date) Minimal absolute temperature	MRH % Minimal relative humidity average	P mm Precipitation	WS m/s Wind speed average
January	16.9 °C (21/01)	-13.5 °C (27/01)	67.50%	1.20	2'10
February	18.1 °C (13/02)	-8.8 °C (18/02)	63.37%	7.60	3'11
March	23.9 °C (20/03)	-8.7 °C (08/03)	57.90%	12.40	3.25
April	28.8 °C (30/04)	-2.6 °C (10/04)	51.94%	7.80	3.54
May	32.5 °C (27/05)	2.9 °C (06/05)	43.40%	16.00	2.72
June	37.3 °C (22/06)	11.9 °C (02/06)	41.18%	9.40	2.61
July	38.8 °C (16/07)	12.7 °C (30/07)	35.48%	1.20	2.90
August	39.3 °C (08/08)	7 °C (22/08)	36.89%	0.00	2.49
September	34.3 °C (03/09)	2.1 °C (19/09)	48.50%	13.00	2.36
October	29.6 °C (01/10)	1.4 °C (04/10)	67.73%	58.00	2.20
November	21.9 °C (03/11)	-3.1 °C (30/11)	75.32%	26.60	2.30
December	12.7 °C (07/12)	-5.2 °C (15/12)	78.17 %	14.80	2.72

Slight rainfall takes place during spring and at the end of autumn. The annual rainfall average is 39.02 mm. In the summer, rains appear as large isolated storms. Snowfall is not exceptionally great and occurs in December and January, and occasionally in the spring.

== Demographics ==
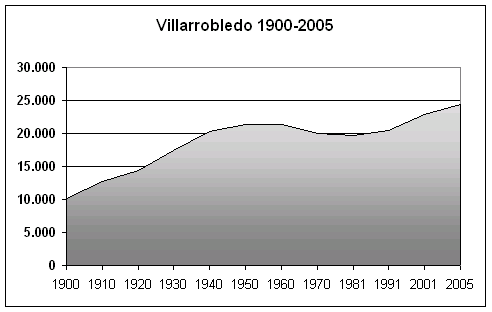

Historical population
Year	Pop.	±%
1900	10,133	—
1910	12,702	+25.4%
1920	14,350	+13.0%
1930	17,641	+22.9%
1940	20,362	+15.4%
1950	21,432	+5.3%
1960	21,356	−0.4%
1970	19,963	−6.5%
1981	19,655	−1.5%
1991	20,396	+3.8%
1996	22,165	+8.7%
2001	22,936	+3.5%
2005	24,729	+7.8%
2010	26,686	+7.9%
Instituto Nacional de Estadistica de España (Spanish National Institute of Statistics)

- Population: 26,686 inhabitants.
- Demonymes: (In Spanish) Villarrobletano/a or Villarrobledense. Also correct are Villarrobledano/a and Villarrobletense, though they have minor use. Troyano (trojan) is colloquial and Agualubio/a is derogatory.
- Entities: City of Villarrobledo and the minor entities of Casas de Peña (<100 hab.), Moharras (deserted) and Ventas de Alcolea (<100 hab.).
- Neighborhoods: Asturias (Pío XII), Centro, Juan Valero, San Antón, Socuéllamos, Virgen de la Caridad (Casas Baratas) and Pintores.

At present, there is a notable population increase by the massive immigration of citizens of East Europe. A City Council study in 2006 found the number of immigrants to be 3,324 persons, of whom 2,011 (60.50%) are men, and 1,313 (39.50%) women, arriving from 43 different countries. The ten countries that contribute most to immigration are Romania, Ukraine, Morocco, Moldavia, Colombia, Paraguay, Bolivia, Ecuador, Bulgaria and Peru.

== Government ==
2003–2007 legislature
Personnel	Party
1. Pedro Antonio Ruiz Santos (Alcalde- Presidente); 2. José Antonio Cabañero Losa; 3. Carmen Martínez Parra; 4. Antonio Arribas Castillo; 5. María José Parra Jareño; 6. Juan Luis Íñiguez Perea; 7. María Paz Saez Montejano; 8. Juan Ramon Martínez Valero; 9. María Rosario Herrera Gómez; 10. Marco Antonio Blázquez Herreros; 11. María Elvira Calero Nueda; 12. Andrés Jiménez Collado	PSOE
1. Bernardo Cabañero González; 2. Roman Lacoba Martínez; 3. Caridad Martínez Marhuenda; 4. Mariano López Ortiz	AIV
1. Maria Belen Alite Landete; 2. Antonio Sánchez Moreno; 3. Luis Martínez García	PP
1. Rafael Núñez Paez; 2. Teresa Lozano Laguía	Not assigned^{1}
^1 Chosen originally under PP

The City Council of Villarrobledo, presided by Spanish Socialist Workers' Party, is made up by the Councillors listed in the right table.

Also, Villarrobledo is head of No. 6 Judicial Party of the province of Albacete, which includes the municipalities of El Bonillo, Munera, Ossa de Montiel and Villarrobledo.

== History ==
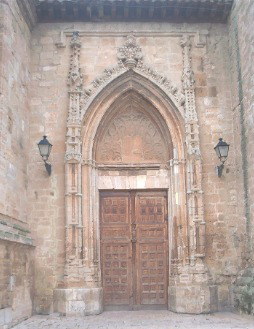
Gothic Portic of San Blas Church (14th century)

The present location of Villarrobledo dates from 1292, according to diverse historical sources. In its history, vestiges of almost all the historical cultures that have existed in the Iberian Peninsula have existed in Villarrobledo, all the way from the Paleolithic to the present.

=== Archaeological findings ===
==== Paleolithic ====
...nos atreveríamos a definir la industria lítica del yacimiento de La Jaraba dentro de ... la fase del Achelense Superior final con micoquiense...

— José Luis Serna López, Avance al estudio del yacimiento achelense de La Jaraba (Villarrobledo, Albacete)

Between La Jaraba and La Paradica, there are found remains of the first human civilizations in the province of Albacete corresponding to Upper Acheulean (Lower Paleolithic) people. In this place there have been found diverse stone tools, manufactured on nuclei or stone chips, which can be seen in the archaeological section of the Albacete Provincial Museum. There are other five archaeological deposits from the Middle Paleolithic.

==== Bronze Age ====
There are many fortified settlements from the Bronze Age, especially in the south zone of the municipal area, related to the Bronze Culture of La Mancha or Motillas Culture

==== Visigoths ====
...Ergávica, insigne capital de valeroso distrito en el extremo de la Celtiberia, y silla episcopal en tiempo de los godos con el nombre de Arcávica. Dilatábase ... su territorio, ... al Sur, en ... Casa de Lipa, cerca de Villarrobledo... Mi estudio..., ha puesto en claro estas reducciones geográficas...

— Aureliano Fernández- Guerra y Orbe, Una Tésera celtíbera. -Datos sobre las ciudades celtibéricas de Ergávica, Munda, Cértima y Contrebia

Historically, it is documented in the Hitación de Wamba the existence of the Church of Lila, (also known as Lipa, Liba or Belida) in las Casas de Lipa (place of La Elipa, less than 10 km to the south of the urban center) assigned to the Bishoprics of Mentesa (Villanueva de la Fuente, Ciudad Real) (3rd to 7th century) and Ergávica (Santaver near Cañaveruelas, Cuenca) (600 to 693).

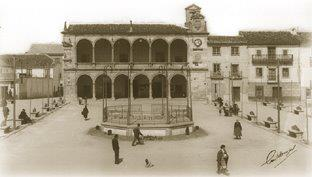
Villarrobledo Plaza (circa 1955)

== Modern era ==
The Battle of Villarrobledo was fought here in 1836.

== Natives ==
- Alonso Ortiz. Renaissantist humanist and writer
- Miguel Cano. Baroque architect and sculptor, father and first master of Alonso Cano, renowned painter and sculptor.
- Diego Morcillo Rubio de Auñón. Spanish Archbishop and twice Viceroy in Peru.
- Tomás de Torrejón y Velasco. Baroque music and Ópera composer.
- Manuel "Champi" Herreros. 80 cc FIM World Champion, in 1989.
