= Saint John the Baptist (Alonso Cano) =

Sculpture by Alonso Cano

Coordinates: 41°39′27″N 4°43′25″W

John the Baptist
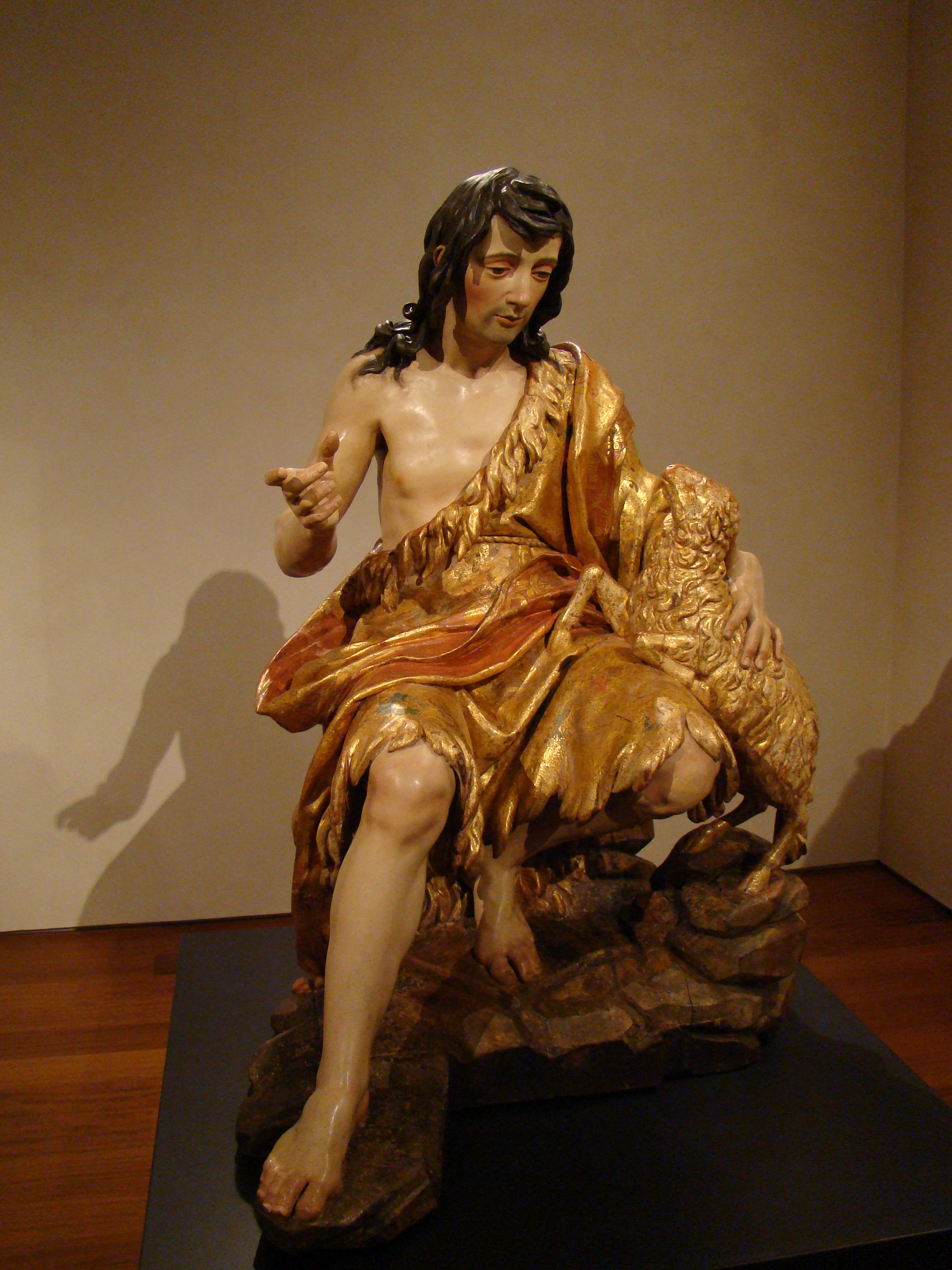
- Artist: Alonso Cano
- Year: 1634
- Catalogue: CE1142
- Type: Sculpture
- Medium: Polichrome wood
- Dimensions: 119 cm × 79 cm × 89 cm (47 in × 31 in × 35 in)
- Location: National Sculpture Museum; Valladolid
- Website: National Museum of Sculpture

John the Baptist is a sculpture by the Baroque artist Alonso Cano, housed in the National Sculpture Museum, Valladolid. The sculpture was made by the artist for the church of San Juan de la Palma, during his Seville period.

In 1634 the Parish of Saint John the Baptist commissioned painter Juan del Castillo and retable joiner Miguel Cano, father of Alonso, a retable to include paintings and the central sculpture of Saint John. It was carved by Alonso Cano inspired by Martínez Montañés’ St. John the Baptist from St. Anne's convent (Seville). The sculpture is characterized by its idealized naturalism.
