= Benjamín Urrutia =

Ecuadorian-born Israeli author and scholar

Benjamín Urrutia (born January 24, 1950) is an author and scholar. With Guy Davenport, Urrutia edited The Logia of Yeshua, which collected what Urrutia and Davenport consider to be Jesus' authentic sayings from a variety of canonical and non-canonical sources. Urrutia interprets Jesus' mission as a leadership role in the "Israelite nonviolent resistance to Roman oppression".

== Biography ==
Urrutia was born in Guayaquil, Ecuador. He lived in Ecuador until 1968, and has since been a resident of the United States of America, except for the period from May 1974 to July 1977, when he lived in Israel. At Brigham Young University, he studied under Hugh Nibley. Learning from Nibley that the Book of Mormon names Shiblon and Shiblom may be derived from the Arabic root shibl, "lion cub," Urrutia connected this to the "Jaguar Cub" imagery of the Olmec people.

Urrutia has also elaborated on Nibley's argument that the word Makhshava, usually translated as "thought," is more correctly translated as "plan." Urrutia has made some contributions to the study of Egyptian Names in the Book of Mormon.

Over the years, Urrutia has written and published a number of articles, letters, poems and reviews on matters related to the work of J. R. R. Tolkien.

Benjamin Urrutia contributed stories to every volume of the LDSF series – anthologies of Science Fiction with LDS themes. He edited the second and third volumes of the series.

Urrutia has been a book reviewer since 1970 and a film critic since 1981. As of 2017, he is a book reviewer and the principal film critic for The Peaceable Table. He is a strong advocate of Christian vegetarianism.

== Ideas ==
=== New Testament and Talmud ===
Urrutia contends that Rabbi Yeshua Bar Abba was the historical Jesus of Nazareth and was the leader of the successful nonviolent Jewish resistance to Pontius Pilate's attempt to place Roman eagles—symbols of the worship of Jupiter—on Jerusalem's Temple Mount. Josephus, who relates this episode, does not say who the leader of this resistance was, but shortly afterwards states that Pilate had Jesus crucified. (Many scholars believe this passage of Josephus may have been slightly but significantly altered by later editors.)

The Gospel of the Hebrews says that the suggestion to be baptized by John came from the mother and brothers of Jesus, and Jesus himself agreed only reluctantly. Contrary to the common opinion, Urrutia insists that this version must be the authentic one because 1) it is strongly supported by the Criterion of Embarrassment (Jesus changes his mind and agrees to somebody else's idea) and 2) the gospel was produced by the community that included the family of Jesus and therefore is the most likely to include authentic family traditions.

A Talmudic legend describes a rabbi who encounters the Messiah at the gates of Rome, where the Messiah is tending to the wounds of homeless individuals. When asked about the timing of his arrival, the Messiah responds, "Today!" This statement can be interpreted to imply that the expectation of a future arrival of the Messiah may not be necessary, suggesting instead that he is present in the current moment, particularly among those who are homeless, wounded, hungry, and oppressed.

In chapter 8 of the Gospel of John, "the Jews who believed in Jesus" state that as children of Abraham, they have never been slaves. However, Jews observing mainstream Second Temple Judaism and later Rabbinic Judaism recited prayers at Passover, every Shabbat, and throughout the year, evoking the memory of their ancestors having been slaves in Egypt as told in the biblical Book of Exodus. This portion of John is likely the fictional creation of an editor unaware of Jewish culture and religion. (Note: John 8:33 They answered Him, “We are Abraham’s descendants and have never yet been enslaved to anyone;…” does not belong to the phrase/category of Jesus' comments to the Jews who believed. (30 As He spoke these things, many came to believe in Him. 31 So Jesus was saying to those Jews who had believed Him, “If you continue in My word, then you are truly disciples of Mine; 32 and you will know the truth, and the truth will make you free.”) Rather, "They answered him" should be read as the ongoing oppositional faction of Jewish leadership (The Jews who believed, in John 8:31, rightly follows the previous verse, whereas verse 33 continues the context of Jesus' conflict with the unbelieving Jews… (the edit of John 8 by some uninformed redaction is extremely unlikely and the effort to reconcile this is simple, parse verses 31-32 with 29, then continue 33 with the rest of the narrative of Jesus' conversation/conflict with… John 8:3 The scribes and the Pharisees brought a woman… a simpler reading and not requiring later assumptions of redaction.)

=== Hebrew Bible/Old Testament ===
Urrutia applied the Structuralist theories of Claude Lévi-Strauss to the first chapter of the Hebrew Bible in the article "The Structure of Genesis, Chapter One."

Accepting Jeff Popick's theory that the Forbidden fruit is a symbolic reference to animal flesh, Uritia offered an additional argument in favor of his exegesis: "Whether the serpent ... is the 'most subtle' of beasts or not, he certainly is a most carnivorous one. If Mr. Serpent taught our ancestors to eat forbidden food, he taught it by example. And nothing he eats is vegan or kosher."

Urrutia found connections between the Israelite hero Joseph and the Greek hero Theseus. These include carnivorous cattle and the number seven.

Urrutia found and pointed out similarities between Nimrod and pharaoh Amenhotep III (known as Nimmuria in the Amarna Letters).

Urrutia examined Kabbalistic and other sources and found evidence Yahweh was anciently considered the son of El.

Urrutia pointed out parallels between the Nuer's relationship to the Dinka and that of the Israelites to the Canaanites and suggested a glottochronological approach.

Urrutia wrote a brief article on the Egyptian religious ritual of the Opening of the Mouth. In it, he traces common themes between the Opening of the Mouth and Psalm 51, such as opening the mouth (or of the lips, in Psalm 51), healing broken bones, and washing the inner organs with special cleansing spices.

Urrutia pointed out that there are hints in the Bible that the authors may have known that not all the sons of Zedekiah perished in the Chaldean invasion.

=== Ancient languages ===
The name Mormon is explained by Urrutia as derived from the Egyptian words Mor ("love") and Mon ("firmly established").

In 1984, Urrutia produced the first translation of the "Spangler Nodule," an iron nodule allegedly found in Ohio in 1800 with an inscription carved on it. According to Urrutia, the text says YHWWY (which, Urrutia suggests, may be a variant of the Tetragrammaton).

=== Contemporary issues ===
Urrutia was influenced by the Structuralism of Claude Lévi-Strauss but took exception to the French anthropologist's too-easy acceptance of anti-Mormon slanders.

In a review of a book that presents cases of children who have made substantial and even complete recoveries from autism spectrum disorder with a dairy-free diet, Urrutia avers that considering 1) that most humans cannot digest cow's milk and 2) that "an ounce of prevention is worth a ton of cure," "all parents should cease and desist from feeding cow's milk to their infants and children before they develop autism (not to mention childhood-onset diabetes)."

== Reception ==
A reviewer in The Washington Post wrote: "In general, Davenport and scholar Benjamin Urrutia translate as plainly as possible, often giving familiar phrases a contemporary lilt: 'No one can work for two bosses...' Throughout, The Logia of Yeshua freshens familiar New Testament injunctions, encouraging us to think anew about their meanings."

Robert Jonas wrote in the Shambhala Sun: "Davenport and Urrutia must be applauded for their desire to awaken the reader by offering these new, bare translations of Jesus' sayings."

Professor Raphael Patai responded to Urrutia's ideas, and the two scholars had a lively dialogue for two issues of American Anthropologist.

== Publications ==
- The Logia of Yeshua: The Sayings of Jesus. Translated and edited in collaboration with Guy Davenport (1996). ISBN 1-887178-70-8

== See also ==
- Baptism of Jesus
- Christian vegetarianism
- Jesuism
- Josephus on Jesus
- People with Basque ancestors
- Urrutia
