= Da Vinci's Bicycle =

1979 collection of short stories by Guy Davenport

- Da Vinci's Bicycle
- Author: Guy Davenport
- Language: English
- Genre: American fiction
- Publisher: Johns Hopkins University Press
- Publication date: 1979
- Publication place: United States

Da Vinci's Bicycle is a 1979 book of short stories written by Guy Davenport and published by New Directions, it was his second collection of stories and contains some of his most important fiction. According to Publishers Weekly, "this acclaimed story collection features such characters as Gertrude Stein, Richard Nixon and the great Leonardo himself."

Hilton Kramer of The New York Times has said, "Davenport’s conception of the short story form is remarkable. He has given it some intellectual density of the learned essay, some the lyrical concision of the modern poem–some of its difficulty too–and a structure that often resembles a film documentary. The result is a tour de force that adds something new to the art of fiction."
