= List of people with Basque ancestors =

This is a list of famous people which are of Basque ancestry. For this purpose, people considered are those with ancestors –either fully or partially– from the extended Basque Country (including the Basque Autonomous Community, the French Basque Country and Navarre).

It does not include people

- born or resident in the Basque Country, unless self-identifying as not Basque (e.g. Galician immigrants, French immigrants etc.)
- people born outside the Basque Country of Basque ancestry that either speak Basque or self-identify as being of Basque stock.

For notable Basques, please see List of Basques.

== Artists ==
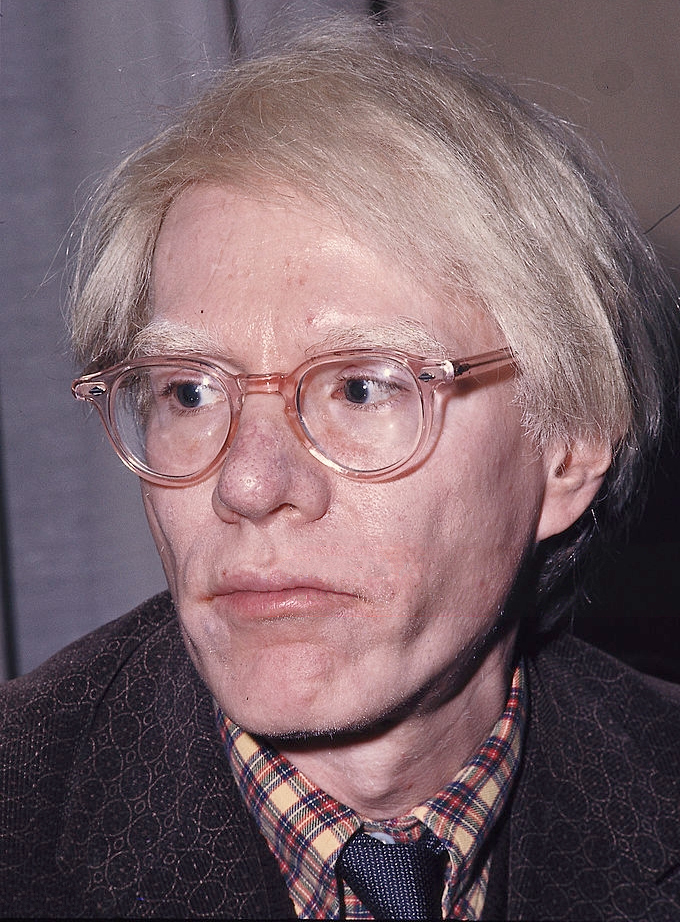
Iconic U.S. artist Andy Warhol was of Basque descent on his mother's side

- Jean Anouilh, dramatist
- Joe Ansolabehere, animation screenwriter and producer
- Earl W. Bascom, American artist and sculptor
- Maitena Burundarena, Argentinian cartoonist
- Hector Elizondo, Puerto Rican actor
- María Félix, Mexican actress
- Galen Gering, movie actor
- Frederic Remington, American western artist and sculptor
- Benicio del Toro, Puerto Rican actor and film producer
- Benny Urquidez (known as Benny the Jet), martial artist
- Benjamin Urrutia, writer
- Andy Warhol, American painter and pop artist
- Ricardo Estanislao Zulueta, contemporary interdisciplinary artist and writer

== Athletes ==
- Javier Aguirre, footballer.
- Frenchy Bordagaray, Major League baseball player.
- Sergio Goycochea, footballer.
- John Jaso, major league baseball player
- Valeri Kharlamov, ice hockey player
- Guillermo Ochoa, footballer.
- Julio Olarticoechea, footballer. World cup winner.
- Ted Williams, former Major League baseball player.
- Rupert de Larrinaga, skier.

== Business people ==
- Dominique Amestoy, founder of the Farmers and Merchants Bank
- John Arrillaga, real estate.
- Emilio Azcarraga Vidaurreta, television.
- Roberto Goizueta, former president, chairman and CEO of the Coca-Cola Company
- Joseph A. Unanue, businessman.
- Zobel de Ayala family. Real estate, banking, and telecommunications.
- Jose Arechabala Aldama, founder of the original 'Havana Club' Rum Corporation of Cuba.

== Clergy ==
- Miguel Zugastegui

== Criminals ==
- Pablo Escobar

== Explorers ==
- Juan Bautista de Anza I
- Sebastian Vizcaino
- Felipe de Salcedo
- Juan de Salcedo
- Juan de Oñate
- Pedro Sarmiento de Gamboa
- Jedediah Smith

== Journalists ==
- Cristina Saralegui

== Military figures ==
- Eugene W. Biscailuz
- Charles de Salaberry
- Margot Duhalde

== Musicians ==
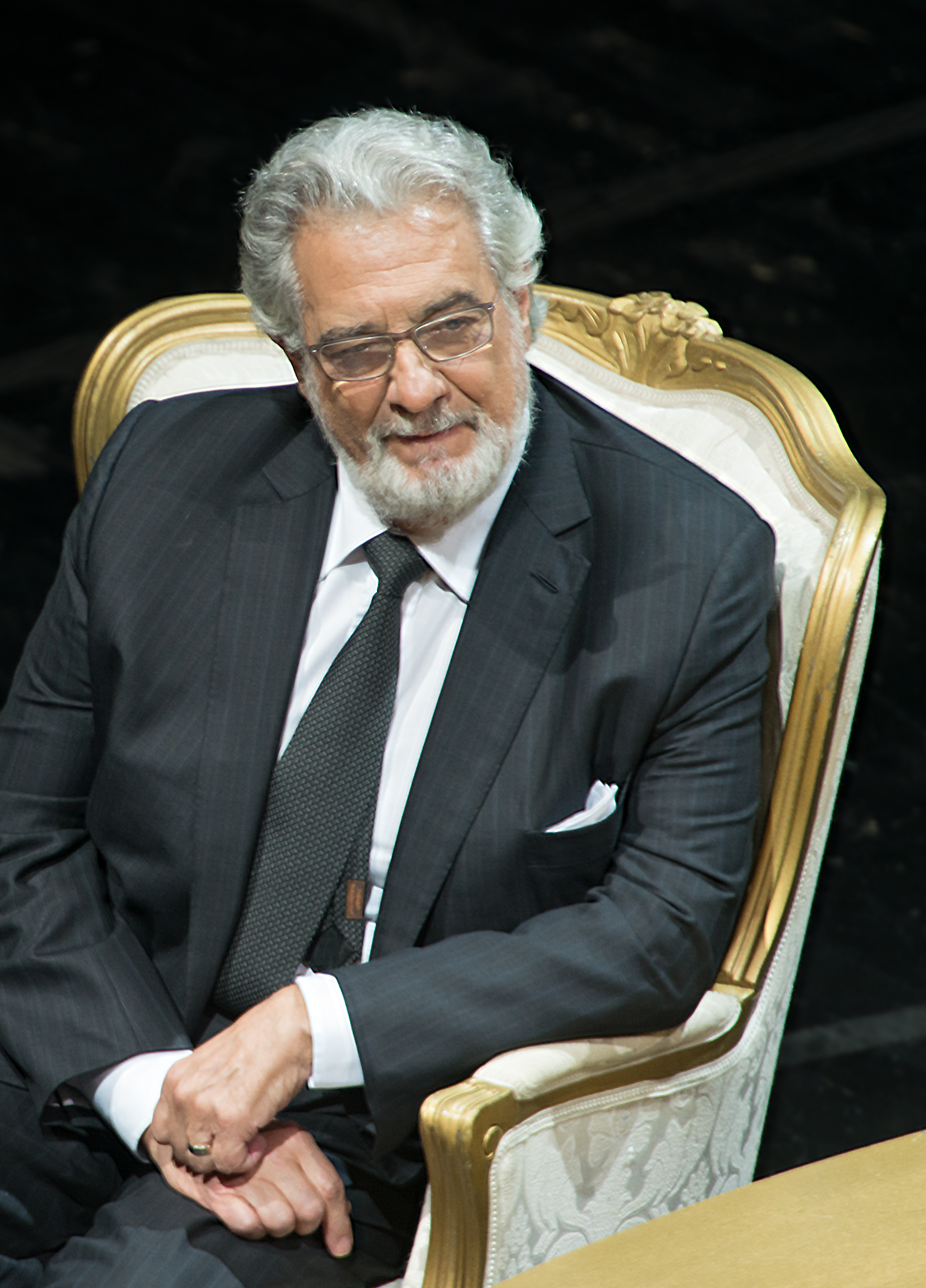
Famous opera singer, Plácido Domingo, is the son of Basque soprano Pepita Embil

- David Archuleta, singer.
- Cecilia Arizti, Cuban composer.
- Willy DeVille, singer.
- Manu Chao.
- Plácido Domingo, singer.
- Andrea Echeverri.
- Juan Esteban Aristizabal Vásquez (known as "Juanes"), Colombian singer.
- Rocio Igarzábal, Argentine singer, actress, model.
- José Iturbi, composer, conductor and pianist.
- Carlos Jean Arriaga, singer and DJ.
- Roland Orzabal.
- Maurice Ravel, composer.
- Enrique Bunbury, Spanish singer, born in Zaragoza as Enrique Ortiz de Landazuri Izardui.
- Treavor Alvarado Abilez Yturriaga (Known s "DJ Trevi") disc jockey, composer.

== Patrons of the Arts ==
- Juan Antonio de Urrutia y Arana
- Adolfo Zaralegui (Saralegui)

== Philosophers ==
- John Etchemendy
- Luce Irigaray, Belgian-born French feminist philosopher and linguist

== Political figures ==
- Pedro Albizu Campos, Puerto Rican Nationalist.
- Alfredo Arrieta Argentinian military and Senator. Brother-in-law of Juan Domingo Perón
- Doroteo Arango (Pancho Villa), revolutionary.
- José María Aznar, former Prime Minister of Spain
- David H. Bieter, mayor of Boise, Idaho.
- Simón Bolívar, Venezuelan military and political leader who liberated much of South America from Spanish rule
- Domingo Bordaberry, Uruguayan politician.
- Juan María Bordaberry, President of Uruguay.
- Pedro Bordaberry, from Uruguay.
- Pete T. Cenarrusa, secretary of State of Idaho.
- Buenaventura Durruti, Spanish revolutionary and Anarcho-syndicalist militant.
- Luis Echeverría, President of Mexico implicated in charges of genocide for the Tlatelolco Massacre
- Joaquín Miguel Elizalde, 20th century Filipino diplomat
- Manuel Fraga Iribarne, minister of Franco's dictatorship and afterwards founder of the Spanish Partido Popular.
- John Garamendi, Lt. Governor of California.
- Emílio Garrastazu Médici, president of Brazil.
- Pete Goicoechea, Nevada state senator.
- Che Guevara, revolutionary.
- Agustín de Iturbide, Emperor of Mexico.
- Jorge Larrañaga, from Uruguay.

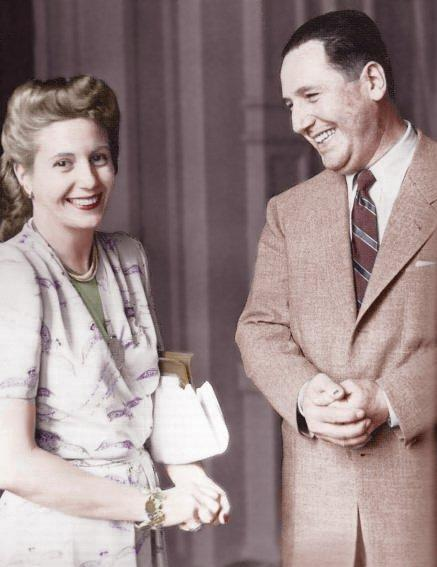
First Lady of Argentina, Eva Perón, better known as "Evita," was primarily of Basque descent; her husband, President Juan Perón, was also of partial Basque heritage

- Octaviano Ambrosio Larrazolo, former Governor of New Mexico.
- Adam Laxalt, US politician
- Paul Laxalt, U.S. Governor and Senator.
- José Mujica, president of Uruguay
- Ramón Músquiz, 19th century Texan politician
- José F. Ozámiz
- Eva Duarte de Perón, Argentinian leader and politician. Wife of Juan Domingo Perón
- Augusto Pinochet Ugarte, Chilean dictator
- Ignace-Michel-Louis-Antoine d'Irumberry de Salaberry.
- Étienne de Silhouette, Controller-General of Finances under Louis XV; namesake of the term silhouette
- Zenón de Somodevilla y Bengoechea, Marquis of Ensenada, former Prime Minister of Spain.
- Rafael Urdaneta, last president of the Republic of Great Colombia.
- Álvaro Uribe, President of Colombia (2002–2010)
- Ben Ysursa, Secretary of State of Idaho.
- Rosario Ibarra, Mexican human rights activist and presidential candidate.
- Máxima Zorreguieta, Argentinian Queen of the Netherlands.
- Marcelo de Azcárraga y Palmero, prime minister of Spain.

== Scientists ==
- Florence Bascom, geologist.
- Louis Daguerre, inventor of photography.

== Writers ==
- Gloria E. Anzaldua, Chicana feminist writer and activist
- Alexandre Dumas fils
- José de Echegaray Eizaguirre, Nobel Prize Laureate
- Gabriela Mistral, Nobel Prize Laureate
- Benjamin Urrutia
- William Carlos Williams, American poet and medical doctor, Pulitzer Prize laureate
