= Joshua ben Levi =

3rd century Judean scholar of the Talmud

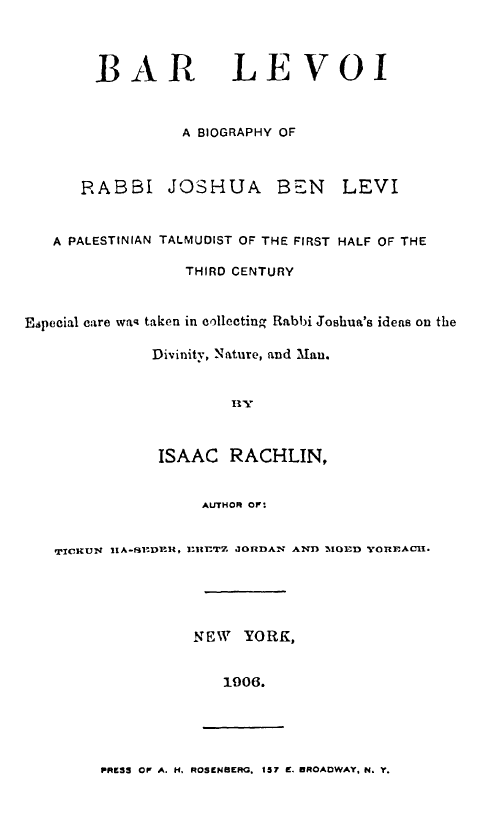
Title page from Rachlin, I. (1906). Bar Levoi. New York: A. H. Rosenberg.

Joshua ben Levi or Yehoshua ben Levi (220 – 250 CE), abbreviated Ribal, was an amora—a scholar of Jewish law during the period in which the Gemara was codified—who lived in the Land of Israel in the first half of the third century. He lived and taught in the city of Lod. He was an elder contemporary of Johanan bar Nappaha and Shimon ben Lakish, who presided over the academy in Tiberias. With Johanan bar Nappaha, he often engaged in homiletic exegetical discussions.

== Etymology ==
It is uncertain whether the name "ben Levi" meant the son of Levi, whom some identify with Levi ben Sisi, or a descendant of the tribe of Levi.

== Biography ==
Rabbi Joshua ben Levi studied under Bar Kappara, whom he often quoted. But Joshua considered his greatest indebtedness to Rabbi Judah ben Pedaiah, from whom he learned many legal rulings. Another of his teachers was Pinchas ben Yair, whose piety and sincerity must have exerted a powerful influence upon the character of Joshua. Joshua himself had a gentle disposition. He was known for his modesty and piety, and whenever he instituted public fasting and prayer, it was said that his appeals were answered.

His love of peace prevented him from making any attacks against the theology of the minim (heretics). He was tolerant, though they often annoyed him. And he forbore cursing one of them, pronouncing rather Psalm 145:9, "God's mercies extend over all His creatures". His love of justice and his concern that the innocent might suffer on account of the guilty led him to speak against the custom then prevailing of removing from office a reader who, by omitting certain benedictions, had aroused the suspicion of heresy.

Joshua devoted much of his time to furthering the public welfare. His wealth, and his alliance to the patriarchal family through the marriage of his son Joseph, must have added to his authority. He was recognized as a representative of the Land of Israel Jewry, for he was found in company with his friend Rabbi Hanina interceding on behalf of his people before the proconsul in Caesarea, who accorded Joshua and his colleague much honor and respect. On another occasion, when Lod was besieged because a political fugitive had found refuge there, Joshua saved the city and its inhabitants by surrendering the refugee. Ula bar Koshev, wanted by the Roman authorities, hid in Lod. The authorities besieged the city and threatened to destroy it if Ula Bar Koshev was not extradited. Ribal persuaded him to turn himself in. Although Ribal acted following the halakha on this issue, he was punished by no longer meriting the revelation of Elijah. After fasting several times, Eliyahu appeared to him again and said: "And to traditions shall I be revealed?"]

Joshua also journeyed to Rome, but his mission is unknown. Although Rabbi Joshua was connected through family ties with the patriarchal house, and always manifested his high esteem for its members, it is mainly due to him that the friendship between the southern schools and the patriarchal house diminished. Joshua was the first to ordain his pupils in all cases where ordination was requisite, thus assuming a power that hitherto had lain in the hands of the head of the Sanhedrin alone.

His son and student Joseph, also a notable amora, married the daughter of Judah haNasi.

=== In legend ===
Joshua ben Levi was a favorite hero in legend. He was often made to be Elijah's companion in the latter's wanderings on earth. See, for example, The Messiah at the Gates of Rome. He also had legendary dealings with the Angel of Death. While yet alive, he was permitted to visit paradise and the netherworld and he sent a description of what he saw there to Rabban Gamaliel through the submissive Angel of Death. Many of the legends relating to Joshua have been collected in separate small works entitled "Ma'aseh deRabbi Yehoshua ben Levi" and "Massekhet Gan Eden veGehinnom."

=== Gravesite ===
The site of his grave is unknown, but Mitch Pilcer of Tzipori claims to have found Rabbi Joshua ben Levi's gravesite while constructing his property there. The grave may be that of another man by the same name.

== Teachings ==
Joshua was of considerable importance in legal interpretation, his decisions being generally declared valid even when disputed by his contemporaries Rabbi Johanan and Resh Lakish. He was lenient, especially in cases where cleanliness and the preservation of health were involved. Joshua devoted himself to the elucidation of the Mishnah. His legal interpretations resemble in their form and brevity the writings of the Tannaim in the Mishnah.

In aggadah, or homiletic exegesis, he was even more influential. He had a high opinion of that study, and he explained Psalm 28:5, "the works of God," as referring to aggada. Similarly in Proverbs 21:21, he identified "glory" (kavod) with homiletic exegesis.

There is also a reference to a book ("pinkes") by Joshua ben Levi which is presumed by some to have presented aggadic themes, but this can not be well reconciled with Joshua's disparaging of the writing down of homiletic exegesis. Nonetheless, homiletic exegesis occupied an important place in the teaching of Rabbi Joshua. His disciples and contemporaries quoted many such propositions in his name.

As an exegete, Rabbi Joshua ben Levi was of some importance, his interpretations often enabling him to deduce legal rulings. Later commentators have accepted some of his explanations.

In the Babylonian Talmud, Ketubot 112a, upon arriving in a place called Gavla, he saw clusters of grapes so large that he mistook them for calves standing among the vines. When it was explained to him that they were in fact grape clusters, he exclaimed: "O earth, O earth! Gather in your fruit. For whom do you produce your fruit? For these gentiles who stand over us in our sins?" Another version of the same passage uses "Arabs" instead of "gentiles" and is therefore cited by archaeologist Eitan Klein as evidence for the migration of neighboring populations into formerly Jewish-dominated areas in the aftermath of the Bar Kokhba Revolt.

A number of his teachings were recorded in the sixth and final chapter of Pirkei Avot (6:2-7), including his 48 attributes of excellent students—the 48th being that of attributing a saying to its original speaker. Joshua ben Levi's emphasis of study was seen when he spoke of God as saying to David (Psalm 84:11) that "better" in God's sight is "one day" of study in the Law "than a thousand" sacrifices. Though learning was of paramount importance, still he also insisted on piety. He said that those who attends the synagogue service morning and evening will have their days prolonged, and those who move their lips in prayer will surely be heard. He instituted a number of rules regulating the reading of the Law in the synagogue on weekdays and other matters relating to the service, many of which are to this day observed in synagogues.

Some of Joshua's philosophical and theological opinions are recorded. Speaking of the attributes of God, he represented God as "great, mighty, and awe-inspiring" (Deut. 10:17). He conceived the relation between Israel and God as most intimate, expressing it in the words, "Not even a wall of iron could separate Israel from his Father in heaven." In his doctrine of future reward and punishment, paradise will receive those who have performed the will of God, while the underworld becomes the home of the wicked. In Psalm 84:5 he found Biblical authority for the resurrection of the dead, and in Genesis Rabbah 26 he expressed the liberal view that immortality is the portion not only of Israel but of all other nations as well. In a legend, Joshua inquired of the Messiah when he was coming, and Elijah answered that it would be when Israel heeds God's voice. In another connection, he spoke of the futility of estimating the time of the coming of the Messiah.

== In popular culture ==
- Henry Wadsworth Longfellow's poem The Legend of Rabbi Ben Levi was published in 1863.

== See also ==
- Shimon bar Yochai
