= Battle of Villarrobledo =

Battle of the First Carlist War

Coordinates: 39.2667°N 2.6000°W

- Part of First Carlist War
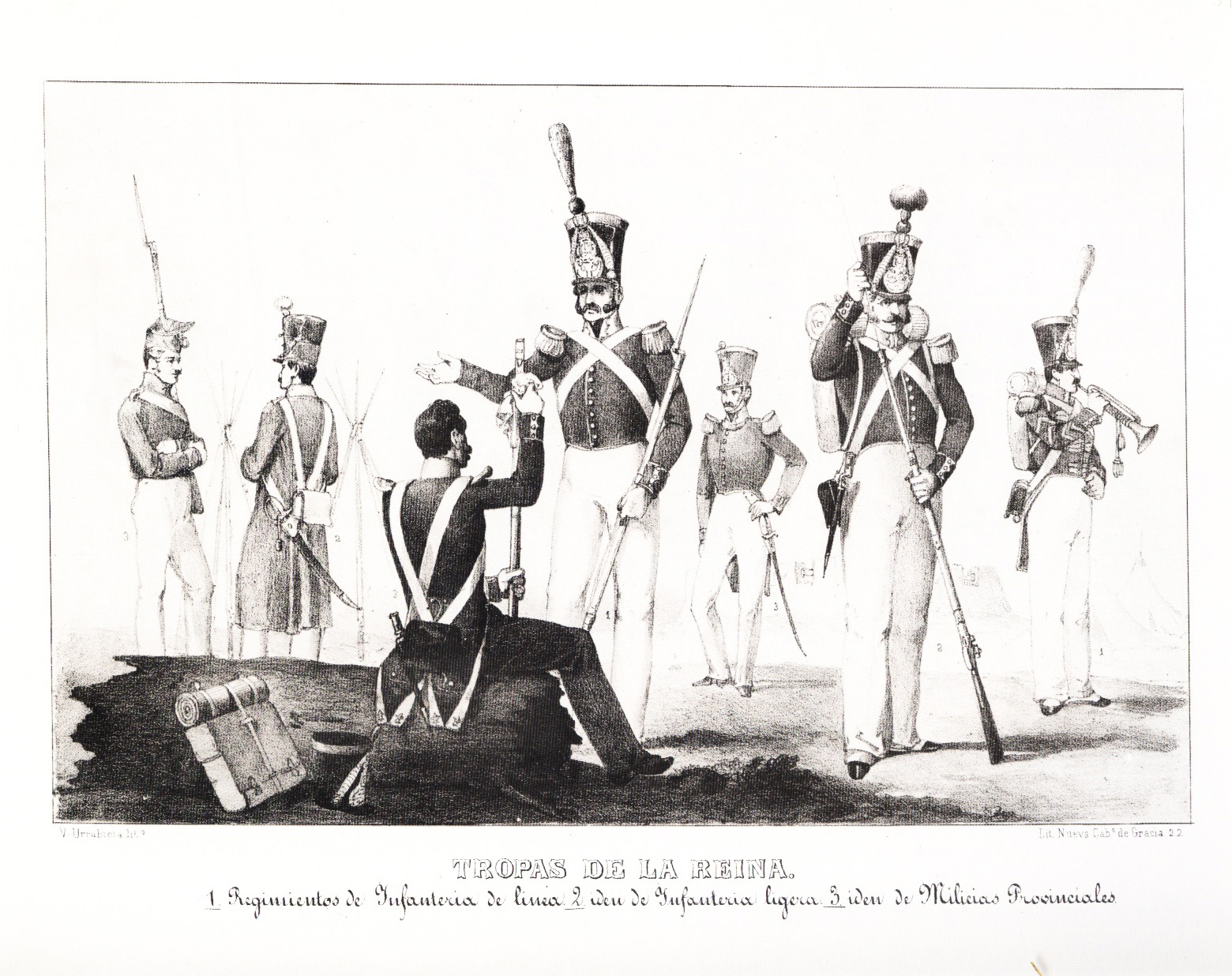
- Tropas Reina 1-album
Date	20 September 1836
Location	Villarrobledo, Castilla-La Mancha, Spain
Result	Liberal victory

Belligerents
Carlists supporting Infante Carlos of Spain	Liberals (Isabelinos or Cristinos) supporting Isabella II of Spain and her regent mother Maria Christina

Commanders and leaders
Miguel Gómez Damas; Ramón Cabrera y Griñó	Isidro de Alaix Fábregas; Diego de León y Navarrete

Strength
4,000 (Gómez’s forces)	~10,000

Casualties and losses
200 dead and wounded, 500 prisoners	Unknown

The Battle of Villarrobledo took place during the First Carlist War on September 20, 1836, south of Villarrobledo at a campground called Vega de San Cristóbal, which lies near a hermitage of the same name. However, there were also casualties reported in Villarrobledo proper. The battle was a major defeat for the Carlist general Miguel Gómez Damas, and his forces suffered large casualties, as well as the loss of large amounts of munitions. For his victory, Isidro de Alaix Fábregas was given the title of Viscount of Villarrobledo (Vizconde de Villarrobledo) and was awarded the Laureate Cross of Saint Ferdinand (Cruz Laureada de San Fernando).

== Order of Battle ==
=== Liberals ===
3rd Division: Gen. Alaix - I and II bat. Principe - I and II bat. Cordova - I and II bat. Almansa - 4 Guides coys. Cavalry: D. Diego de Leon - Princess Hussars (150 troopers) - 1st and 5th Light Cavalry (200 troopers) Total: 4,000 infantry and 350 cavalry

=== Carlists ===
Gen. Goméz: 5 battalions 5 squadrons

Aragón Division: Cabrera

Aragonese Brigade: D. José Marín, "el Serrador" - 3 Battalions Valencian Brigade: D. Joaquín Quilez - 2 Battalions Cavalry: - 580 troopers (6 squadrons)
