= The Logia of Yeshua =

Book by Benjamin Urrutia and Guy Davenport

- Author: Guy Davenport and Benjamin Urrutia
- Cover artist: Hans Memling, "Christ Giving His Blessing"
- Language: English
- Subject: Christianity, parables/sayings
- Publisher: Counterpoint
- Publication date: 1996
- Publication place: U.S.
- Media type: hardcover
- Pages: 67
- ISBN: 1-887178-18-X
- OCLC: 35718720
- Dewey Decimal: 226/.05209 21
- LC Class: BT306 .L583 1996

The Logia of Yeshua, by Guy Davenport and Benjamin Urrutia, published by Counterpoint Press, is a compendium of canonical and extracanonical sayings of Jesus that are considered authentic by the authors. The book won critical praise for its scholarship and poetic language. "Throughout, The Logia of Yeshua freshens familiar New Testament injunctions, encouraging us to think anew about their meanings." "Davenport and Urrutia must be applauded for their desire to awaken the reader by offering these new, bare translations of Jesus' sayings."

The word logia applies to teachings of Jesus used as source materials by the gospel writers in the writing of the canonical gospels. Logia also refers to the logic those teachings imply.

== See also ==
- Q source
