= Guy Davenport =

American writer and painter (1927–2005)

- Born: Guy Mattison Davenport; November 23, 1927; Anderson, South Carolina, U.S.
- Died: January 4, 2005 (aged 77); Lexington, Kentucky, U.S.
- Education: Duke University (BA); Merton College, Oxford (BLitt); Harvard University (PhD)
- Occupations: Writer; editor; professor; literary critic
- Employer(s): Washington University; Haverford College; University of Kentucky
- Writing career
- Notable awards: Rhodes Scholarship; MacArthur Fellowship; PEN Award for Poetry in Translation

Guy Mattison Davenport (November 23, 1927 – January 4, 2005) was an American writer, translator, illustrator, painter, intellectual, and teacher.

== Life ==
Guy Davenport was born in Anderson, South Carolina, in the foothills of Appalachia on November 23, 1927. His father was an agent for the Railway Express Agency. Davenport said that he became a reader only at 10, with a neighbor's gift of one of the Tarzan series. At age eleven, he began a neighborhood newspaper, drawing all the illustrations and writing all the stories. At 13, he "broke [his] right leg (skating) and was laid up for a wearisome while"; it was then that he began "reading with real interest", beginning with a biography of Leonardo da Vinci. He left high school early and enrolled at Duke University a few weeks after his seventeenth birthday. At Duke, he studied art (with Clare Leighton), graduating with a BA summa cum laude in classics and English literature. He was elected to Phi Beta Kappa his junior year.

Davenport was a Rhodes Scholar at Merton College, Oxford, from 1948 to 1950. He studied Old English under J. R. R. Tolkien and graduated with a B.Litt., with a thesis on James Joyce. In 1950, upon his return to the United States, Davenport was drafted into the US Army for two years, spending them at Fort Bragg in the 756th Field Artillery, then in the XVIII Airborne Corps. After the army, he taught at Washington University in St. Louis until 1955, when he began earning a PhD at Harvard, studying under Harry Levin and Archibald MacLeish.

Davenport befriended Ezra Pound during the poet's incarceration in St. Elizabeths Hospital, visiting him annually from 1952 until Pound's release, in 1958, and later at Pound's home in Rapallo, Italy. Davenport described one such visit, in 1963, in the story "Ithaka". Davenport wrote his dissertation on Pound's poetry, published as Cities on Hills in 1983. This interest led him to Hugh Kenner, who became one of his most important literary friends. They carried on a voluminous correspondence from 1958 till 2002, as recorded in the book Questioning Minds: The Letters of Guy Davenport and Hugh Kenner. He also corresponded with a Pound scholar and friend, the literary critic M. Bernetta Quinn.

After completing his PhD, he taught at Haverford College from 1961 to 1963 but soon took a position at the University of Kentucky, "the remotest offer with the most pay," as he wrote to Jonathan Williams. Davenport taught at Kentucky until he received a MacArthur Fellowship, which prompted his retirement, at the end of 1990.

Davenport was married briefly in the early 1960s. He dedicated Eclogues, 1981, to "Bonnie Jean" (Cox), his companion from 1965 to his death. Other Davenport volumes dedicated to Cox include Objects on a Table (1998) and The Death of Picasso (2004). Cox became Trustee for the Guy Davenport Estate.

In one of his essays, Davenport claimed to "live almost exclusively off fried baloney, Campbell's soup, and Snickers bars."

He died of lung cancer on January 4, 2005, in Lexington, Kentucky.

== Writing ==
Davenport began publishing fiction in 1970 with "The Aeroplanes at Brescia," which is based on Kafka's visit to an air show in September 1909. His books include Tatlin!, Da Vinci's Bicycle, Eclogues, Apples and Pears, The Jules Verne Steam Balloon, The Drummer of the Eleventh North Devonshire Fusiliers, A Table of Green Fields, The Cardiff Team, and Wo es war, soll ich werden. His fiction uses three general modes of exposition: the fictionalizing of historical events and figures; the foregrounding of formal narrative experiments, especially with the use of collage; and the depicting of a Fourierist utopia, where small groups of men, women, and children have eliminated the separation between mind and body.

The first of more than four hundred Davenport essays, articles, introductions, and book reviews appeared while he was still an undergraduate; the last, just weeks before his death. Davenport was a regular reviewer for National Review and The Hudson Review, and, late in his life, at the invitation of John Jeremiah Sullivan, he spent a year writing the "New Books" column for Harper's Magazine. His essays range from literary to social topics, from brief book reviews to lectures such as the title piece in his first collection of essays, The Geography of the Imagination. His other collections of essays were Every Force Evolves a Form and The Hunter Gracchus and Other Papers on Literature and Art.

He also published two slim volumes on art: A Balthus Notebook and Objects on a Table. Although he wrote on many topics, Davenport, who never had a driver's license, was especially passionate about the destruction of American cities by the automobile.

Davenport published a handful of poems. The longest are the book-length Flowers and Leaves, an intricate meditation on art and America, and "The Resurrection in Cookham Churchyard" (borrowing the title from a painting by Stanley Spencer). A selection of his poems and translations was published as Thasos and Ohio.

Davenport translated ancient Greek texts, particularly from the archaic period. These were published in periodicals, then small volumes, and finally collected in 7 Greeks. He also translated the occasional other piece, including a few poems of Rilke's, some ancient Egyptian texts [after Boris de Rachewiltz], and, with Benjamin Urrutia, the sayings of Jesus, published as The Logia of Yeshua.

== Visual art ==
With his childhood newspaper, Davenport launched both his literary and artistic vocations. The former remained dormant or sporadic for some time while the latter, "making drawings, watercolors, and gouaches, [continued] throughout school, the army, and his early years as a teacher." He drew or painted nearly every day of his life, and his notebooks contain drawings and pasted-in illustrations and photos cheek by jowl with his own observations and other writings and quotations from others.

From college forward, Davenport supplied cover art and decorations to literary periodicals. He also supplied illustrations for others' books, notably two by Hugh Kenner: The Stoic Comedians (1962) and The Counterfeiters (1968).

The cover of Apples and Pears by Guy Davenport

As a visual artist (and childhood newspaper magnate) who also wrote, Davenport had a lifelong interest in printing and book design. His poems and fictions were often first published in limited editions by small press craftsmen.

In 1965 Davenport and Laurence Scott prepared and printed Pound's Canto CX in an edition of 118 copies, 80 of which they presented to Pound for his 80th birthday. The previous year they had produced Ezra's Bowmen of Shu on the same press, a double broadside that published for the first time, with a brief introductory essay by Davenport, a drawing by sculptor Henri Gaudier-Brzeska and a letter of Gaudier's from the trenches of World War I that cites Pound's poem (translated from one in the Shi Jing) "The Song of the Bowmen of Shu".

Many of Davenport's earlier stories are combinations of pictures and text, especially Tatlin! and Apples and Pears (where some of the illustrations are of pages that resemble those of his own notebooks).

"It was my intention, when I began writing fiction several years ago, to construct texts that were both written and drawn.... I continued this method right through Apples and Pears... The designer [of A+P] understood [my] collages to be gratuitous illustrations having nothing to do with anything, reduced them all to burnt toast, framed them with nonsensical lines, and sabotaged my whole enterprise. I took this as final defeat, and haven't tried to combine drawing and writing in any later work of fiction."

== Awards ==
Davenport received a MacArthur Fellowship in 1990. Davenport received the PEN Award for Poetry in Translation in 1996.

== Works ==
=== Fiction ===
- Tatlin!: Six Stories (Scribner's, 1974) (with illustrations by Davenport)
- Da Vinci's Bicycle: Ten Stories (University of Chicago Press, 1979) (with illustrations by Davenport)
- Eclogues: Eight Stories (North Point Press, 1981) (two stories illustrated by Roy Behrens)
- Trois Caprices (The Pace Trust, 1981) (three stories later collected in The Jules Verne Steam Balloon)
- The Bowmen of Shu (The Grenfell Press, 1984) (limited ed., collected in Apples and Pears)
- Apples and Pears and Other Stories (North Point Press, 1984) (with illustrations by Davenport)
- The Bicycle Rider (Red Ozier Press, 1985) (limited ed., later collected—in a different version—in The Jules Verne Steam Balloon)
- Jonah: A Story (Nadja Press, 1986) (limited ed., later collected in The Jules Verne Steam Balloon)
- The Jules Verne Steam Balloon: Nine Stories (North Point Press, 1987)
- The Drummer of the Eleventh North Devonshire Fusiliers (North Point Press, 1990)
- The Lark (Dim Gray Bar Press, 1993) (limited ed., illustrated by Davenport)
- A Table of Green Fields: Ten Stories (New Directions, 1993)
- The Cardiff Team: Ten Stories (New Directions, 1996)
- Twelve Stories (Counterpoint, 1997) (selections from Tatlin!, Apples and Pears, and The Drummer of the Eleventh North Devonshire Fusiliers)
- The Death of Picasso: New and Selected Writing (Shoemaker and Hoard, 2003) (contains seven essays [three previously uncollected] along with nineteen stories [two previously uncollected] and one play)
- Wo es war, soll ich werden: The Restored Original Text (Finial Press, 2004) (limited ed.)
- The Guy Davenport Reader, ed. Erik Reece (Counterpoint, 2013) (A posthumous collection of Davenport's fiction, essays, poems, translations, and notebooks assembled by Erik Reece, a former Davenport student and his literary executor.)

=== Translations ===
- Carmina Archilochi: The Fragments of Archilochos (University of California Press, 1964)
- Sappho: Songs and Fragments (University of Michigan Press, 1965)
- Herakleitos and Diogenes (Grey Fox Press, 1979)
- The Mimes of Herondas (Grey Fox Press, 1981)
- Maxims of the Ancient Egyptians (The Pace Trust, 1983) (from Boris de Rachewiltz's Massime degli antichi egiziani, 1954)
- Anakreon (The University of Alabama/ Parallel Editions, 1991)
- Archilochos, Sappho, Alkman: Three Lyric Poets (University of California Press, 1980) (adds Alkman to Carmina Archilochi and Sappho: Songs and Fragments)
- The Logia of Yeshua: The Sayings of Jesus (Counterpoint, 1996) (with Benjamin Urrutia)
- 7 Greeks (New Directions, 1995) (revises and collects the texts—but none of Davenport's drawings—from Carmina Archilochi, Sappho: Songs and Fragments, Herakleitos and Diogenes, The Mimes of Herondas, Anakreon, and Archilochos, Sappho, Alkman)

=== Poetry ===
- Cydonia Florentia (The Lowell-Adams House Printers/Laurence Scott, 1966)
- Flowers and Leaves: Poema vel Sonata, Carmina Autumni Primaeque Veris Transformationem (Nantahala Foundation/Jonathan Williams, 1966; Bamberger Books, 1991) (illustrated by Davenport)
- The Resurrection in Cookham Churchyard (Jordan Davies, 1982)
- Goldfinch Thistle Star (Red Ozier Press, 1983) (illustrated by Lachlan Stewart)
- Thasos and Ohio: Poems and Translations, 1950–1980 (North Point Press, 1986) (includes most of Flowers and Leaves, along with translations of six of the "7 Greeks" and of Rainer Maria Rilke and Harold Schimmel)
- 37 Avenue Samson, Cimetiere Montmartre, (Lexington, KY: The King Library Press, 1985) (a single broadsheet limited edition of 150 copies)

=== Commentary and essays ===
- The Intelligence of Louis Agassiz (Beacon Press, 1963)
- Pennant Key-Indexed Study Guide to Homer's The Iliad (Educational Research Associates, 1967)
- Pennant Key-Indexed Study Guide to Homer's The Odyssey (Educational Research Associates, 1967)
- The Geography of the Imagination: Forty Essays. (North Point Press, 1981)
- Cities on Hills: A Study of I – XXX of Ezra Pound's Cantos (UMI Research, 1983)
- Charles Burchfield's Seasons (Pomegranate Artbooks, 1994)
- The Drawings of Paul Cadmus (Rizzoli, 1989)
- Every Force Evolves a Form: Twenty Essays (North Point Press, 1987)
- A Balthus Notebook (The Ecco Press, 1989)
- The Hunter Gracchus and Other Papers on Literature and Art (Counterpoint, 1996)
- Objects on a Table: Harmonious Disarray in Art and Literature (Counterpoint, 1998)
- The Death of Picasso: New and Selected Writing (Counterpoint, 2005)

=== Paintings and drawings ===
- A Balance of Quinces: The Paintings and Drawings of Guy Davenport, with an essay by Erik Anderson Reece (New Directions, 1996)
- 50 Drawings (Dim Gray Bar Press, 1996) (limited ed.) Introduction by Davenport gives an account of the role drawing and painting played in his life.
- Joan Crane's Davenport bibliography (see below) includes a 25-page insert of reproductions that suggest the range of his drawing styles.
- Two books by Hugh Kenner, The Counterfeiters and The Stoic Comedians, include Davenport's crosshatched crow quill and ink work, ten full-page drawings in each.

=== Letters ===
- A Garden Carried in a Pocket: Letters 1964–1968, ed. Thomas Meyer (Green Shade, 2004). Selected correspondence with Jonathan Williams
- Fragments from a Correspondence, ed. Nicholas Kilmer (ARION, Winter 2006, 89–129)
- Selected Letters: Guy Davenport and James Laughlin, ed. W. C. Bamberger (W. W. Norton, 2007)
- Questioning Minds: The Letters of Guy Davenport and Hugh Kenner, ed. Edward M. Burns, 2 vols. (Counterpoint, 2018)
- I Remember This Detail: Letters to Bamberger Books, ed. W. C. Bamberger (Bamberger Books, 2022)

== Published bibliography ==
- Crane, Joan. Guy Davenport: A Descriptive Bibliography, 1947–1995 (Green Shade, 1996).
