= The Messiah at the Gates of Rome =

"The Messiah at the Gates of Rome" is a traditional story, mashal, or parable in Jewish tradition from the Talmudic tractate Sanhedrin 98a.

== Synopsis ==
Rabbi Joshua ben Levi (who lived in the first half of the third century), while meditating near the tomb of Rabbi Shimon Bar Yohai, was visited by the Prophet Elijah. "When will the Messiah come?" asked Joshua. "Ask him," replied the Prophet. "The Messiah is at the gates of Rome, (Note: In the printed text of the Talmud, the phrase is "the entrance to the city" without specifying which city.) sitting among the poor, the sick and wretched. Like them, he changes the bindings of his wounds, but does so one wound at the time, in order to be ready at a moment's notice."

Then Joshua went to Rome and met the Messiah and greeted him, saying "peace upon thee, Master and Teacher" and the Messiah replied "peace upon thee, O son of Levi." Joshua then asked "When will you be coming?" and was told "Today!". Joshua went back to Elijah and was asked what the Messiah said. 'Peace upon thee, O son of Levi', Joshua replied, and Elijah told him that that meant that he and his father would have a place in the world to come. Joshua then said that the Messiah had not told him the truth, because he had promised to come today but had not. Elijah explained "This is what he said to thee, To-day, if ye will hear his voice", a reference to Psalms 95:7, making his coming conditional with the condition not fulfilled.

== Reception ==
Medieval Jews saw the story as possibly anti-Roman, and Rashi interpreted 'Rome' as meaning not the physical city but the part of paradise overlooking Rome. This neutralised and spiritualised the story and reconciled it with legends of the Messiah being carried alive to paradise.

Later, Maharsha went further and suggested that Rome wasn't mentioned at all as 'de Romi' should be read 'deromi', southern, referring to the Messiah being found in the southern part of paradise.

In the early 16th century the Kabbalist Abraham ben Eliezer ha-Levi suggested that the 'Rome' in the story was a small town in Galilee with the same name, and a bit later Moshe Alshich put the Messiah in paradise overlooking this town. Concern about being seen as anti-Roman also led to translations of the Talmud replacing the word 'Rome' in this story to 'the city', 'Karta'.

== Sources ==
- Midrash Tanhuma 9:1
- Leviticus Rabbah 19
- Pesikta 36a
