= Miguel Gómez Damas =

Spanish general (1785—1849)

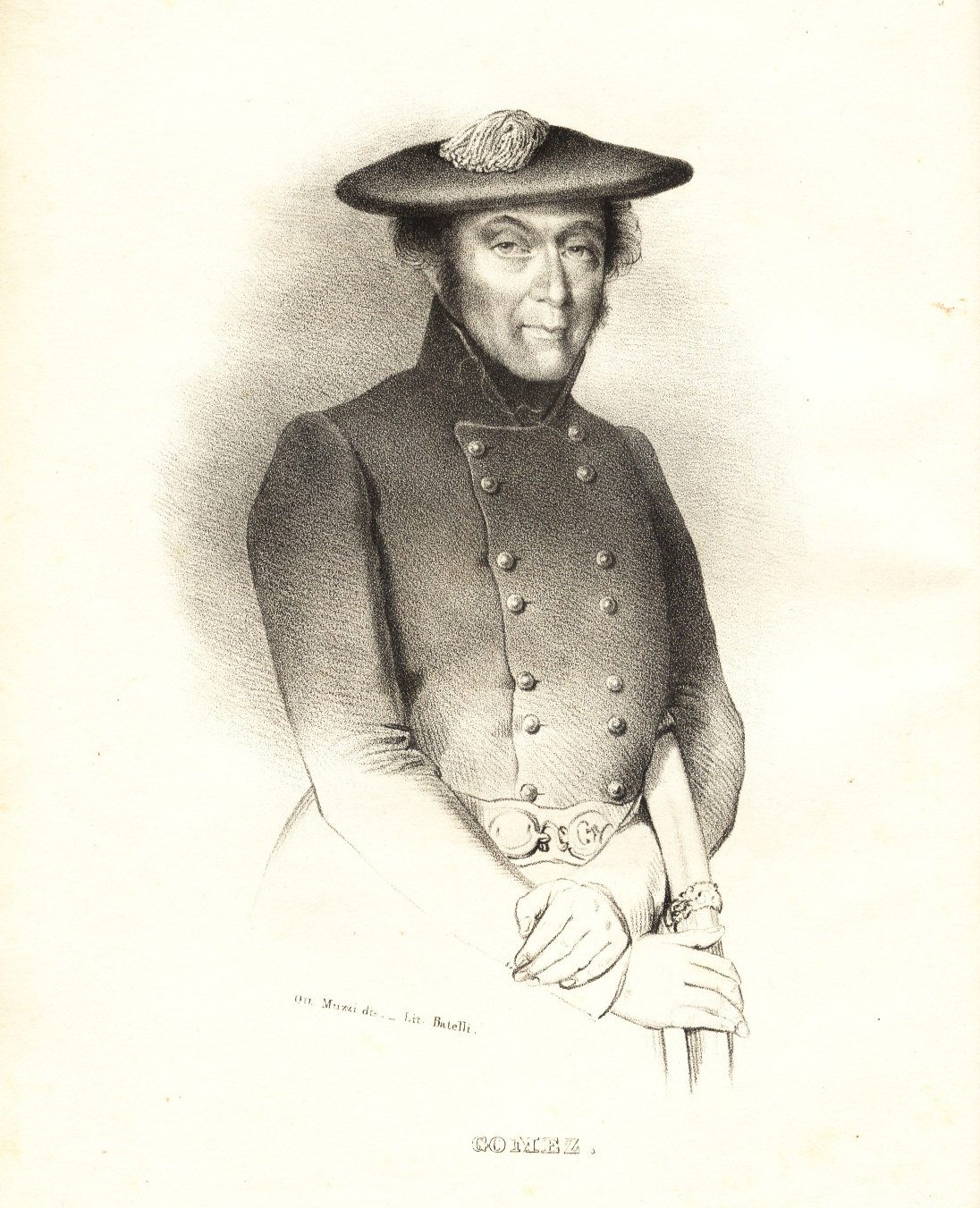
Miguel Gómez Damas

Miguel Gómez Damas (5 June 1785 – 11 June 1849) was a Spanish Carlist general of the First Carlist War.

Born at Torredonjimeno, in the province of Jaén, he served under the Carlist general Tomás de Zumalacárregui and in 1836 undertook an unsuccessful military expedition against Liberal forces in various locations, including Asturias, Galicia, Extremadura, Andalusia, and La Mancha, but suffered defeats. He lost the battles of Villarrobledo and Majaceite.

He died in Bordeaux, France.

His manuscript account of the war was published in 1914 as Memorias militares by Lorenzo Sáenz y Fernández Cortina.
