= Alonso Ortiz =

Spanish humanist writer

Alonso (or Alfonso) Ortiz (Alfonso Hortiz de Urrutia), (Villarrobledo, Albacete, 1455- † h. 1503) was a Spanish humanist writer.
