= Alonso Cano =

Spanish painter, architect and sculptor (1601-1667)

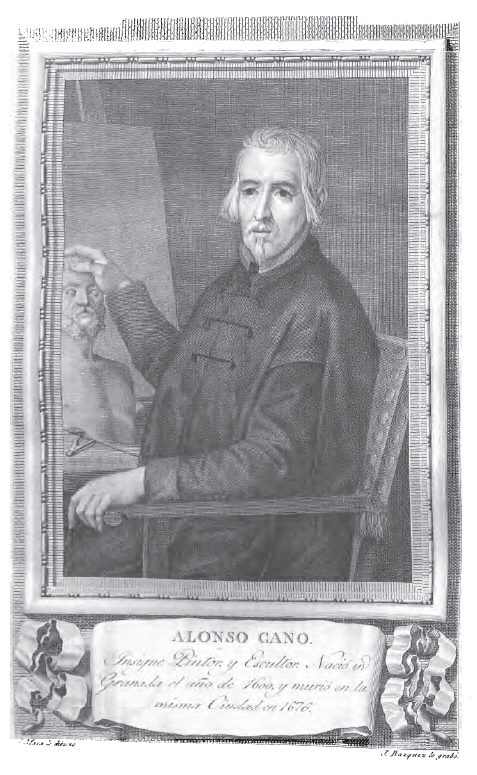
Alonso Cano, (Portraits of Illustrious Spanish), 1791

Alonso Cano Almansa (19 March 1601 – 3 September 1667) was a Spanish painter, architect, and sculptor born in Granada.

== Biography ==
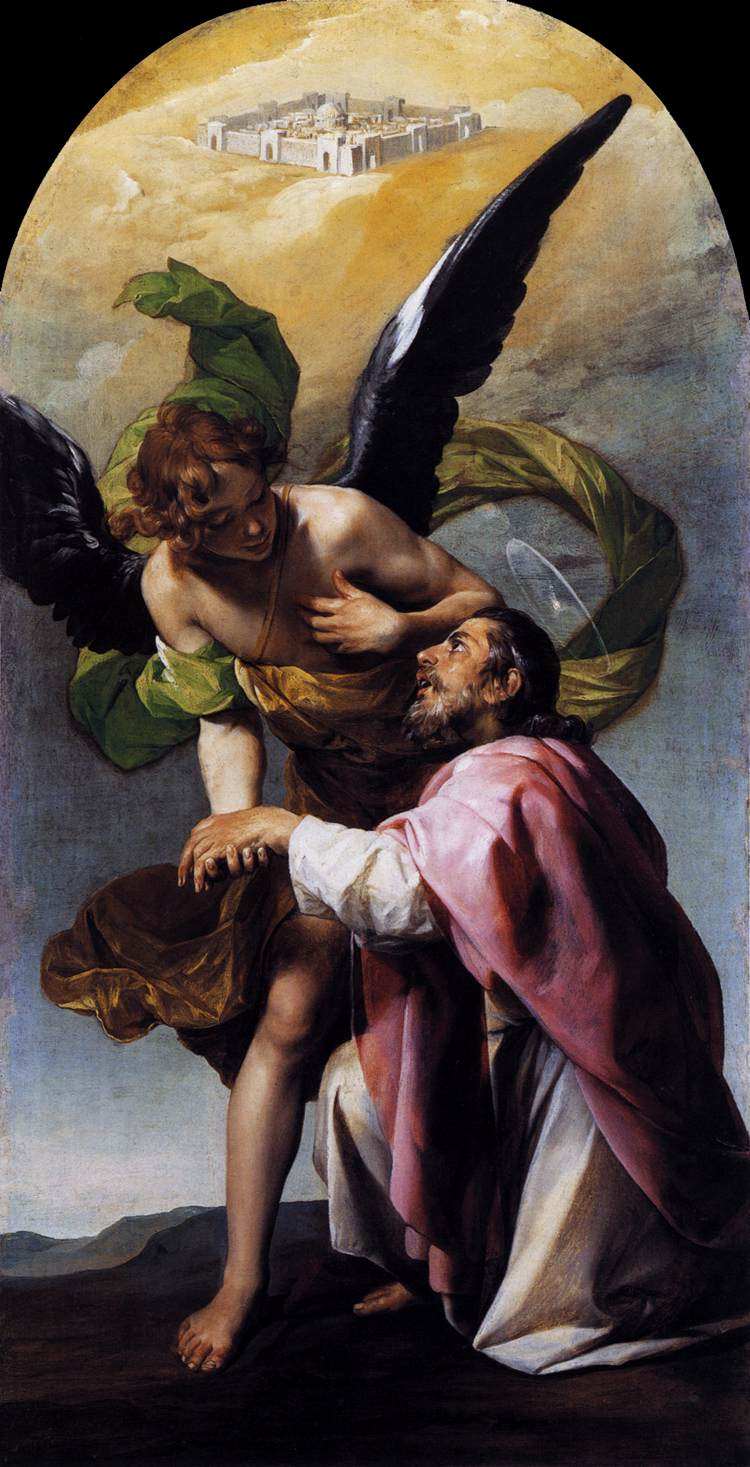
Saint John the Evangelist's Vision of Jerusalem

He learned architecture from his father, Miguel Cano; painting in the academy of Juan del Castillo, and from Francisco Pacheco the teacher of Velázquez; and sculpture from Juan Martínez Montañés. As a sculptor, his most famous works are the Madonna and Child in the church of Lebrija (also called Nebrija), and the colossal figures of San Pedro and San Pablo.

He was made first royal architect, painter to Philip IV, and instructor to the prince, Balthasar Charles, Prince of Asturias. The King gave him the church preferment of a canon of the Granada Cathedral (1652), in order to take up a position as chief architect of the cathedral. Towards the end of his life, he designed the cathedral façade, which was erected to his design after his death.

He was notorious for his ungovernable temper; and it is said that once he risked his life by committing the then capital offence of dashing to pieces the statue of a saint, when in a rage with the purchaser who begrudged the price he demanded. According to another story, he found his house robbed after coming home one evening, his wife murdered, and his Italian servant fled. Notwithstanding the presumption against the fugitive, the magistrates condemned Cano, because he was of a jealous temper. Upon this he fled to Valencia, but afterwards returned to Madrid, where he was put to the torture, which he endured without incriminating himself, and the king received him into favour.

After the death of his wife he took Holy Orders as a protection from further prosecution, but still continued his professional pursuits. He died in 1667. In his last moments, when the priest held to him a crucifix, he told him to take it away because it was badly carved. According to the Catholic Encyclopedia, the dying Cano refused the Sacrament from a priest who gave it to conversos.

Works

- San Vicente Ferrer (praying)
- Virgin of the Olive Tree (1629)
- Inmaculada del Facistol (1655–1656) in the sacristy of the Cathedral of Granada.
- Virgen of Bethlehem
- Bust of Saint Paul
- Head of San Juan de Dios
- Annunciation
- Christ Bound to the Column in the church of the Convento del Stmo. Cristo de la Victoria de Serradilla (Cáceres).
- Entrance of the Cathedral of Granada
- Saint John the Baptist as a Youth 1634, in the National Sculpture Museum (Valladolid).
- St. Anthony Preaching to the Fishes (ca. 1630) [The Detroit Institute of Arts]
- Christ and the Samaritan Woman(ca. 1650-1652) Real Academia de Bellas Artes de San Fernando Madrid.
- The Death of Saint Francis. Real Academia de Bellas Artes de San Fernando, Madrid.
- The Christ Crucified (c.1646) Real Academia de Bellas Artes de San Fernando.

Works by Cano in the Prado Museum in Madrid include:

- The Crucifixion
- Saint Anthony of Padua
- The Crucified Christ appears to Saint Teresa
- A king of Spain
- Two kings of Spain
- The Miracle of the Well
- Saint Bernard and the Virgin
- The Virgin and Child
- The Dead Christ supported by an Angel

== Gallery ==
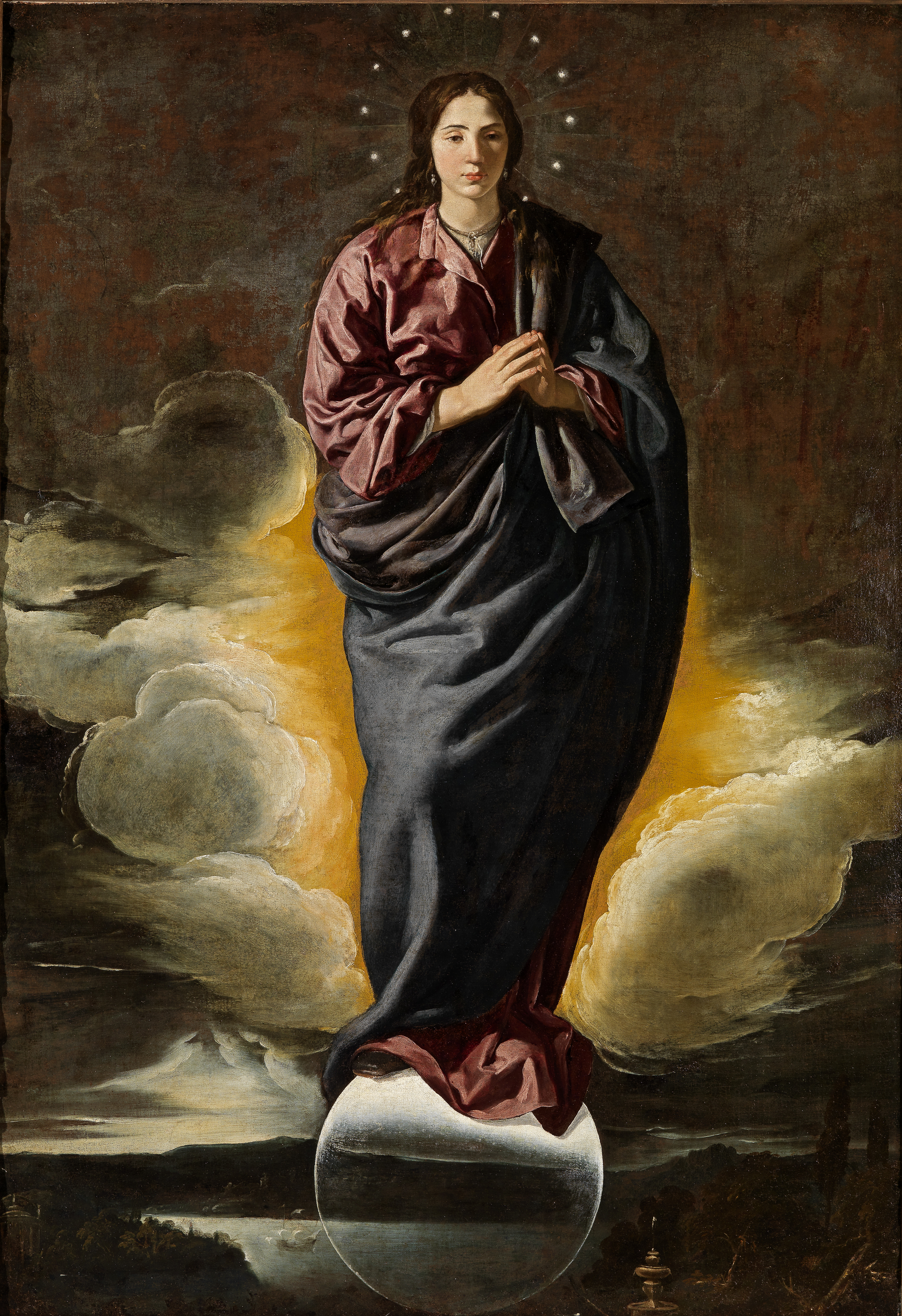
Immaculate Conception, c. 1618–20, attributed to Velázquez or Cano

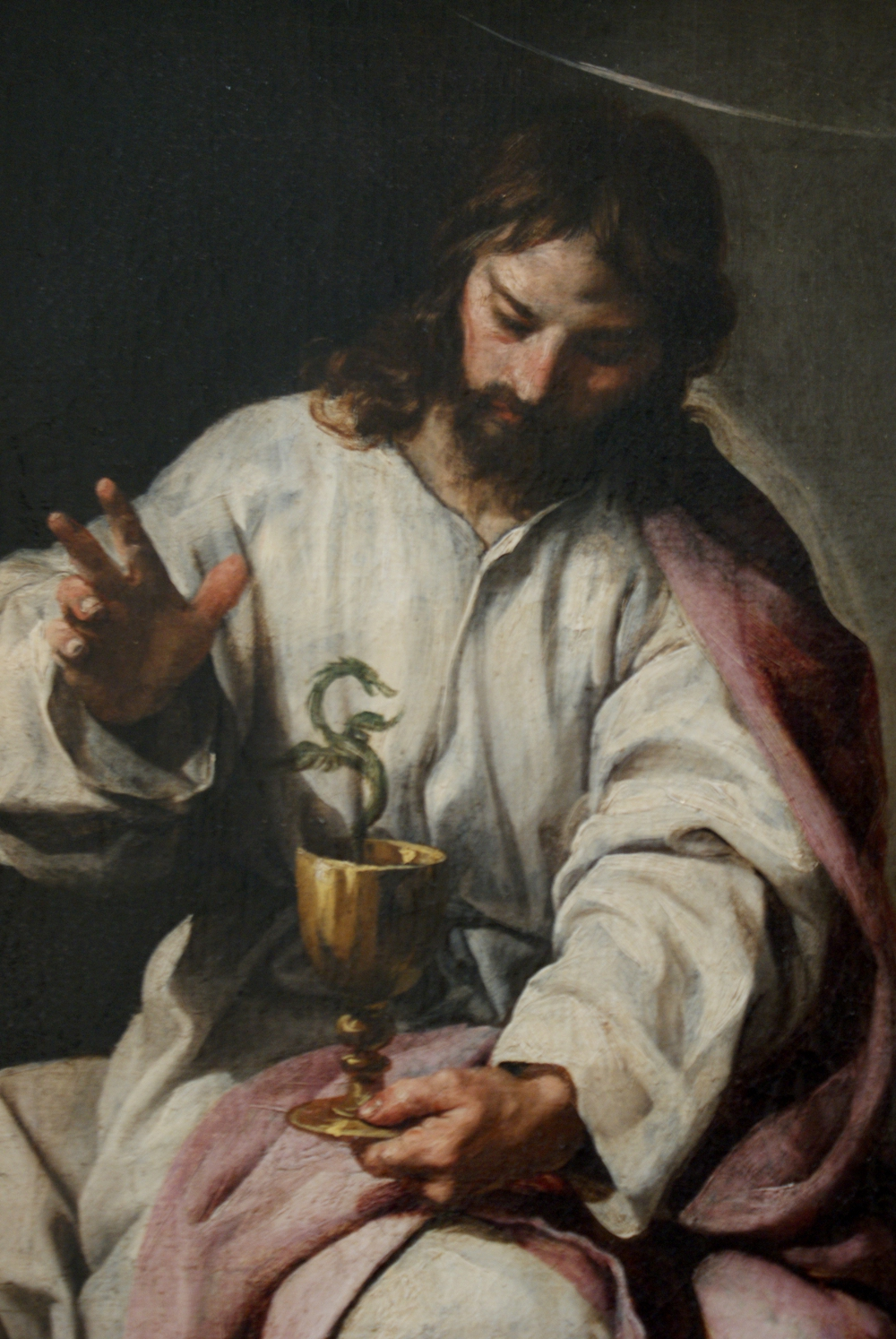
Saint John and the Poisoned Chalice, c. 1635–37

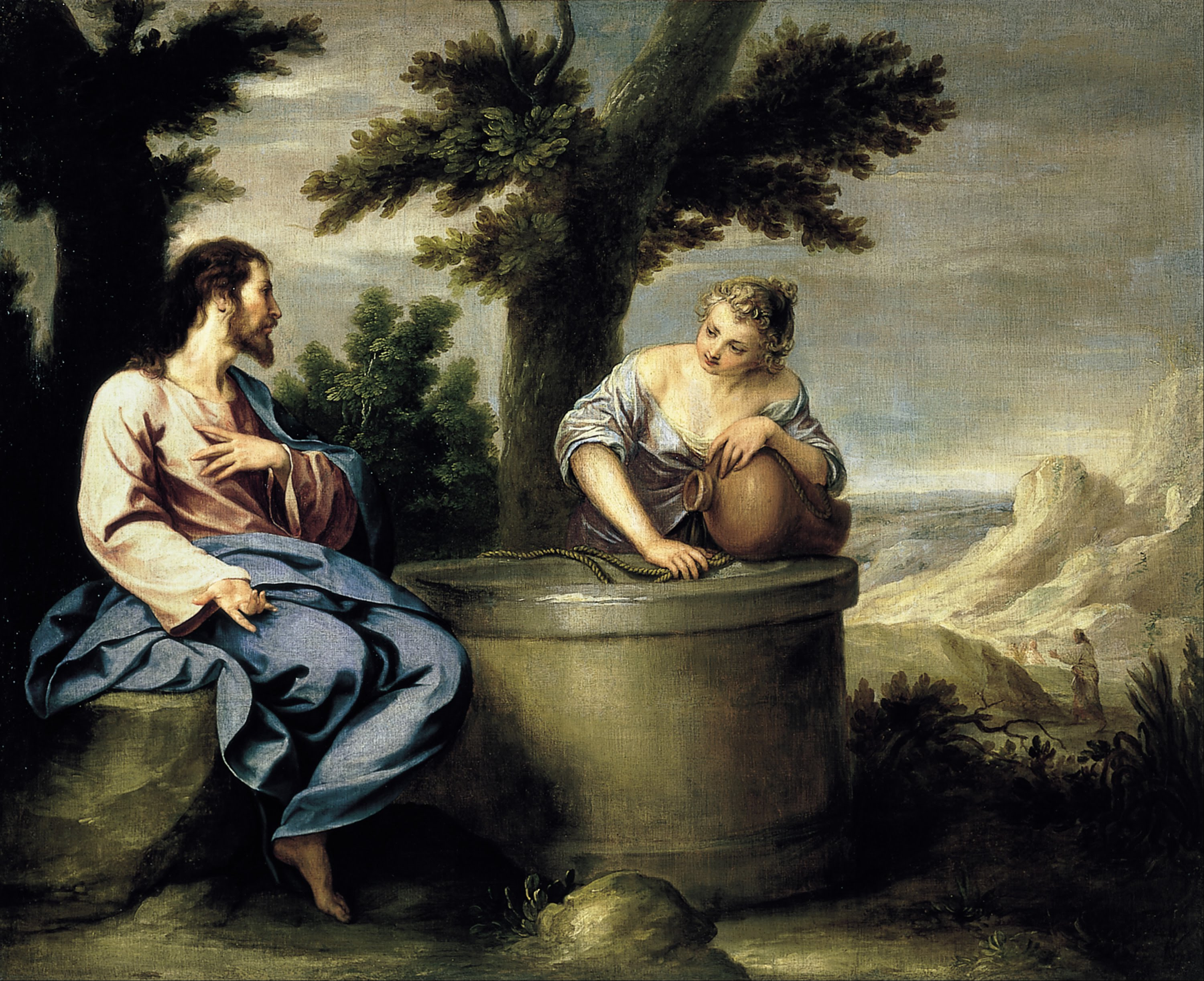
Cristo y la Samaritana, Christ and the Samaritan woman, 1640

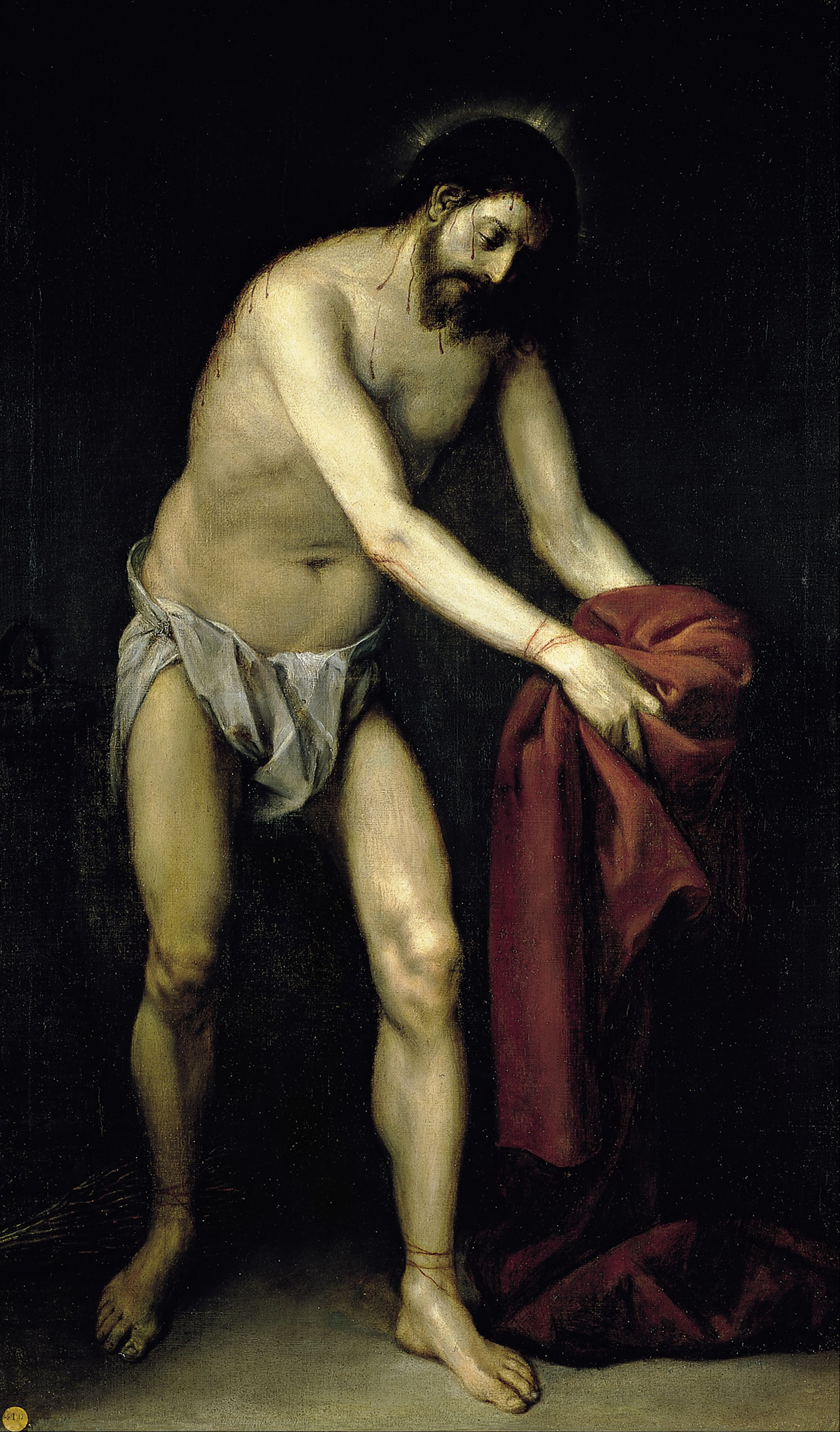
Christ Gathering his Robes, 1646

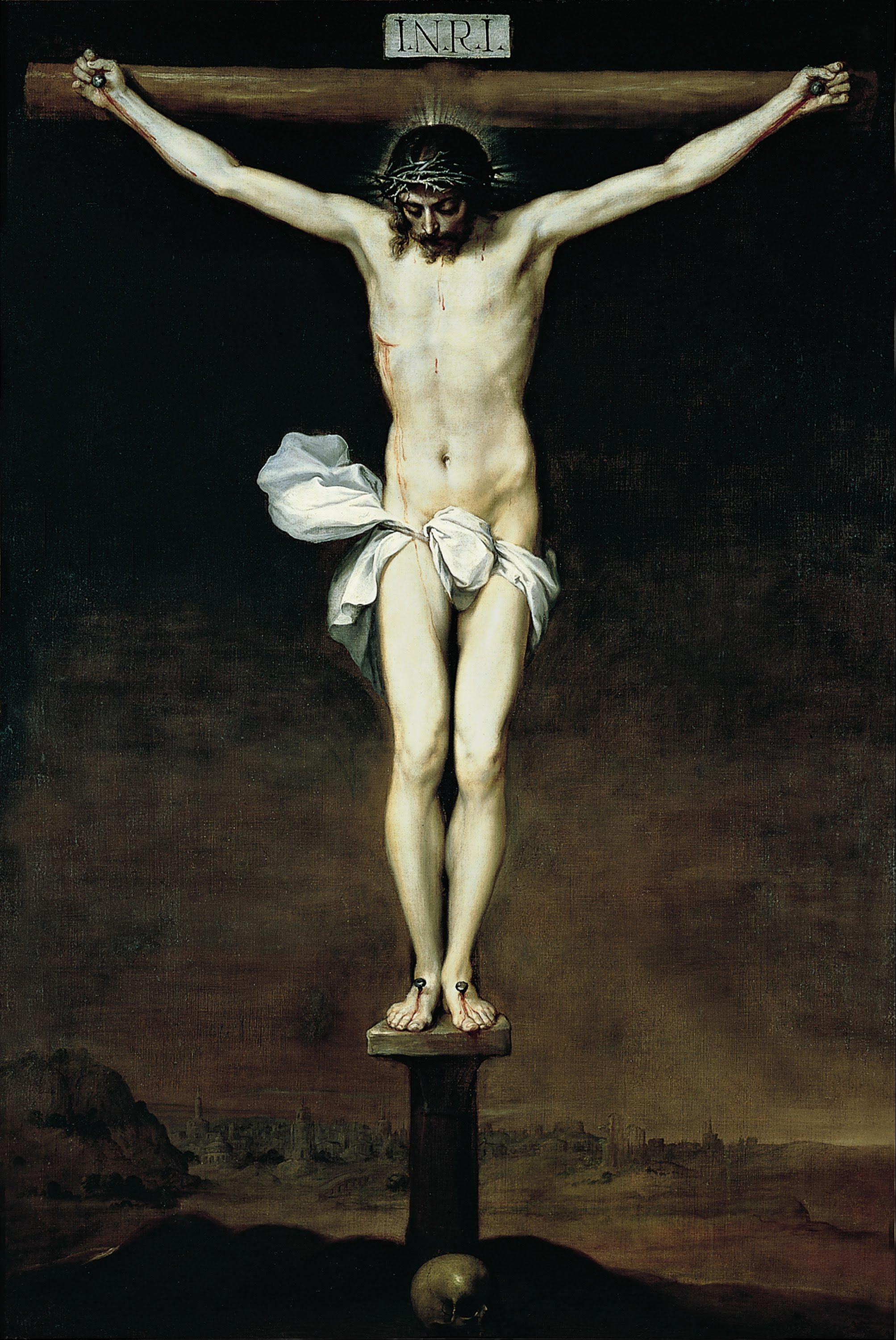
Cristo crucificado, Christ on the cross, 1646

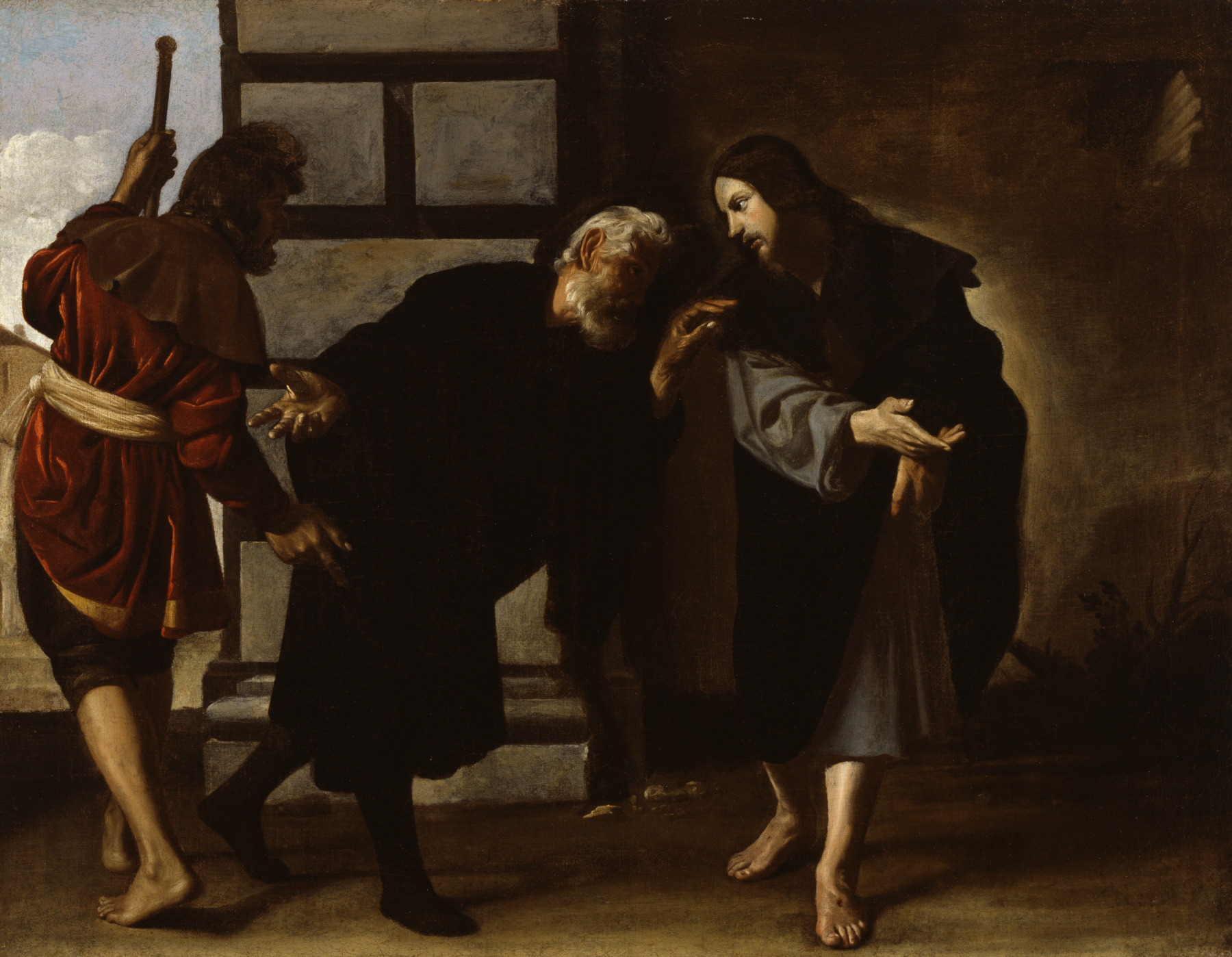
Christ and Two Followers on the Road to Emmaus, between 1635 and 1650

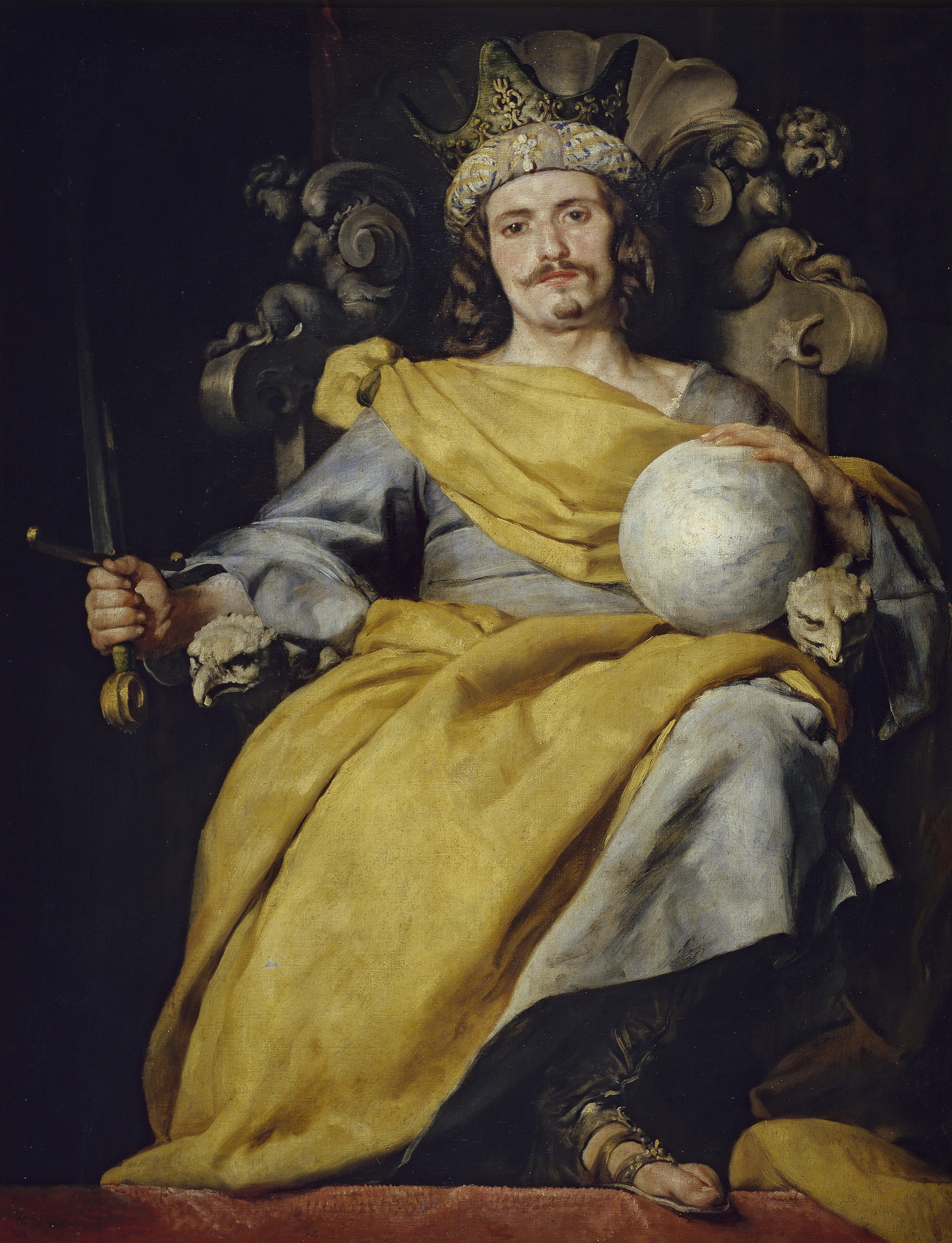
Ideal portrait of a Spanish King, 1643

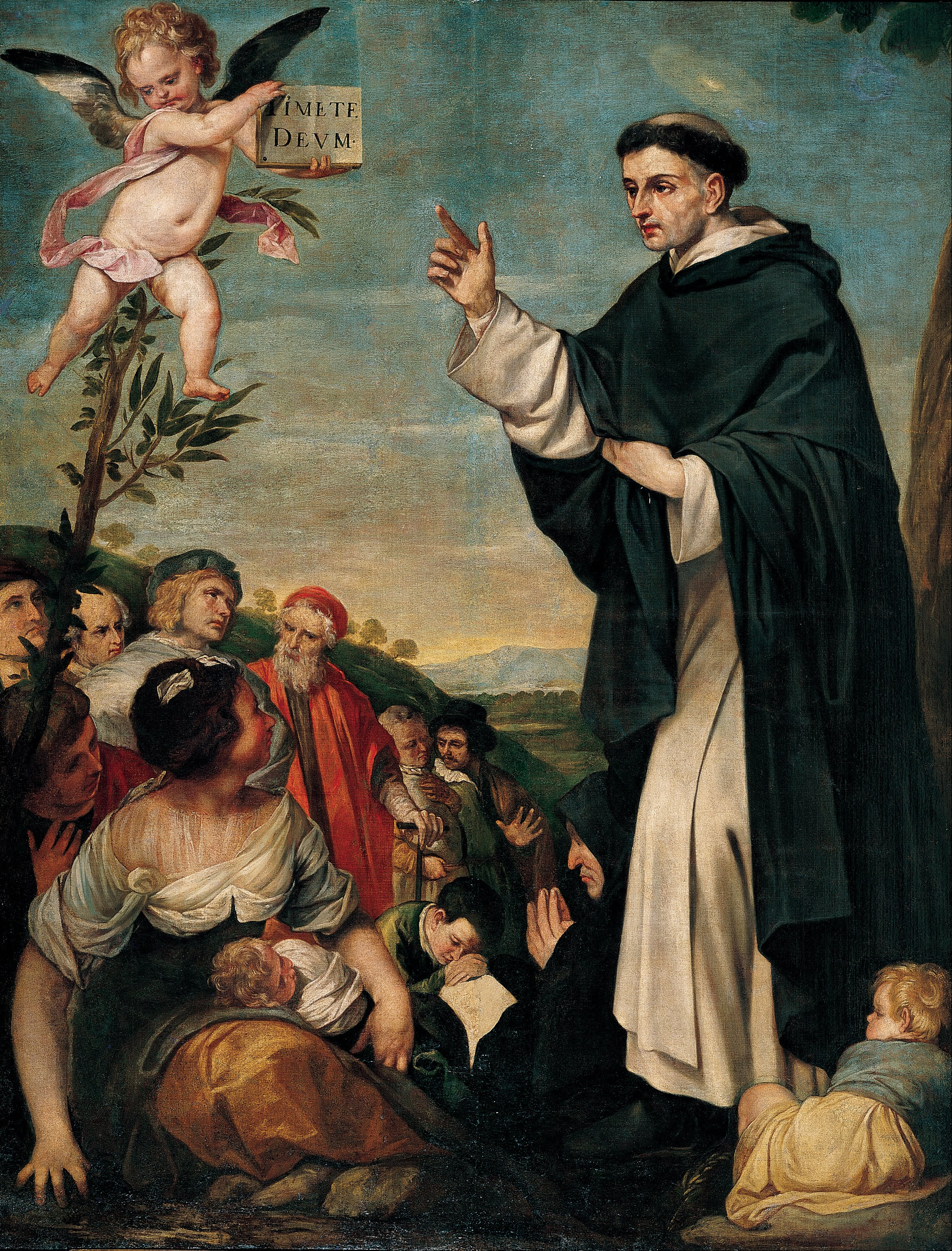
St. Vincent Ferrer Preaching, c. 1644–45

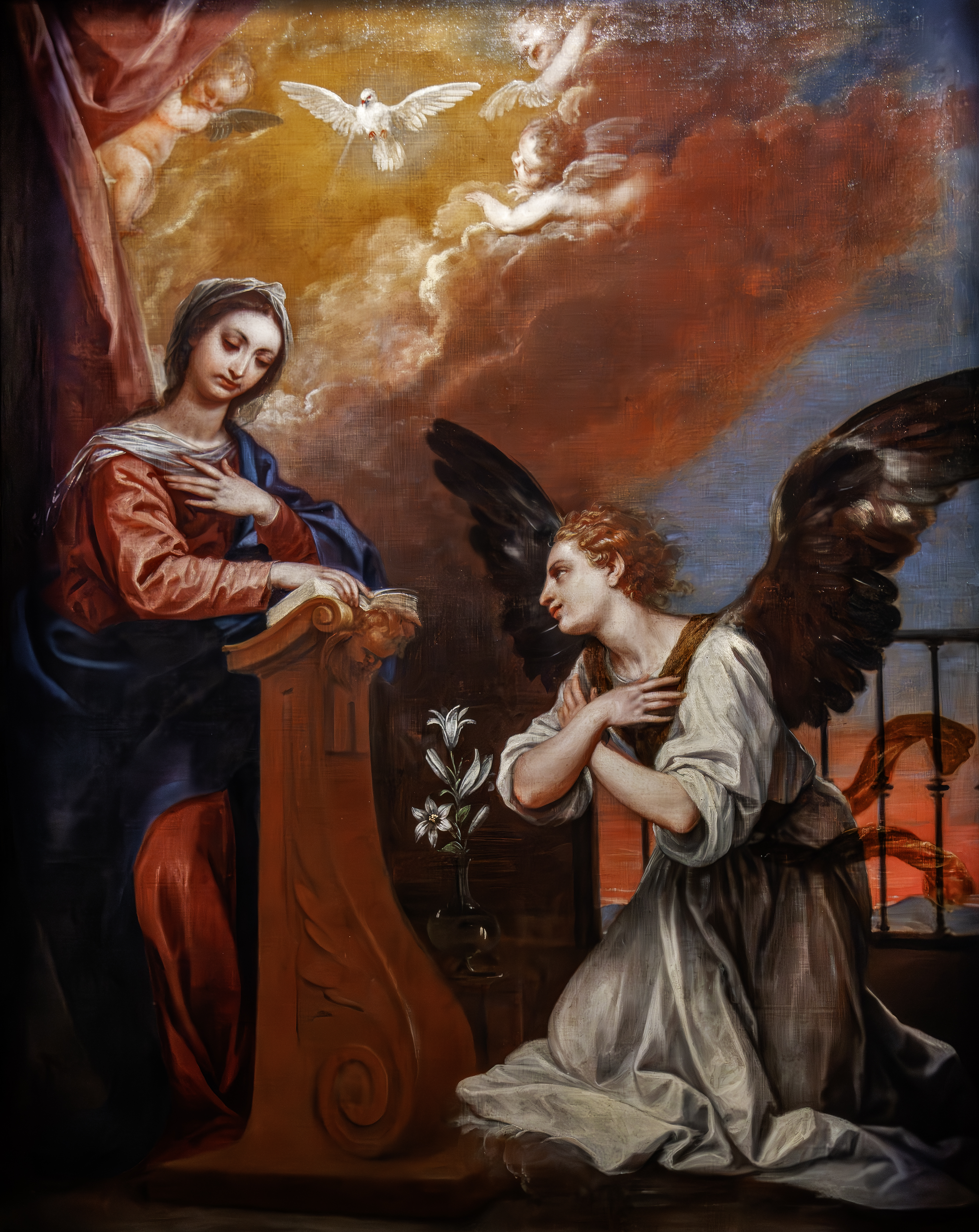
The Annunciation, c.1655 Goya Museum.

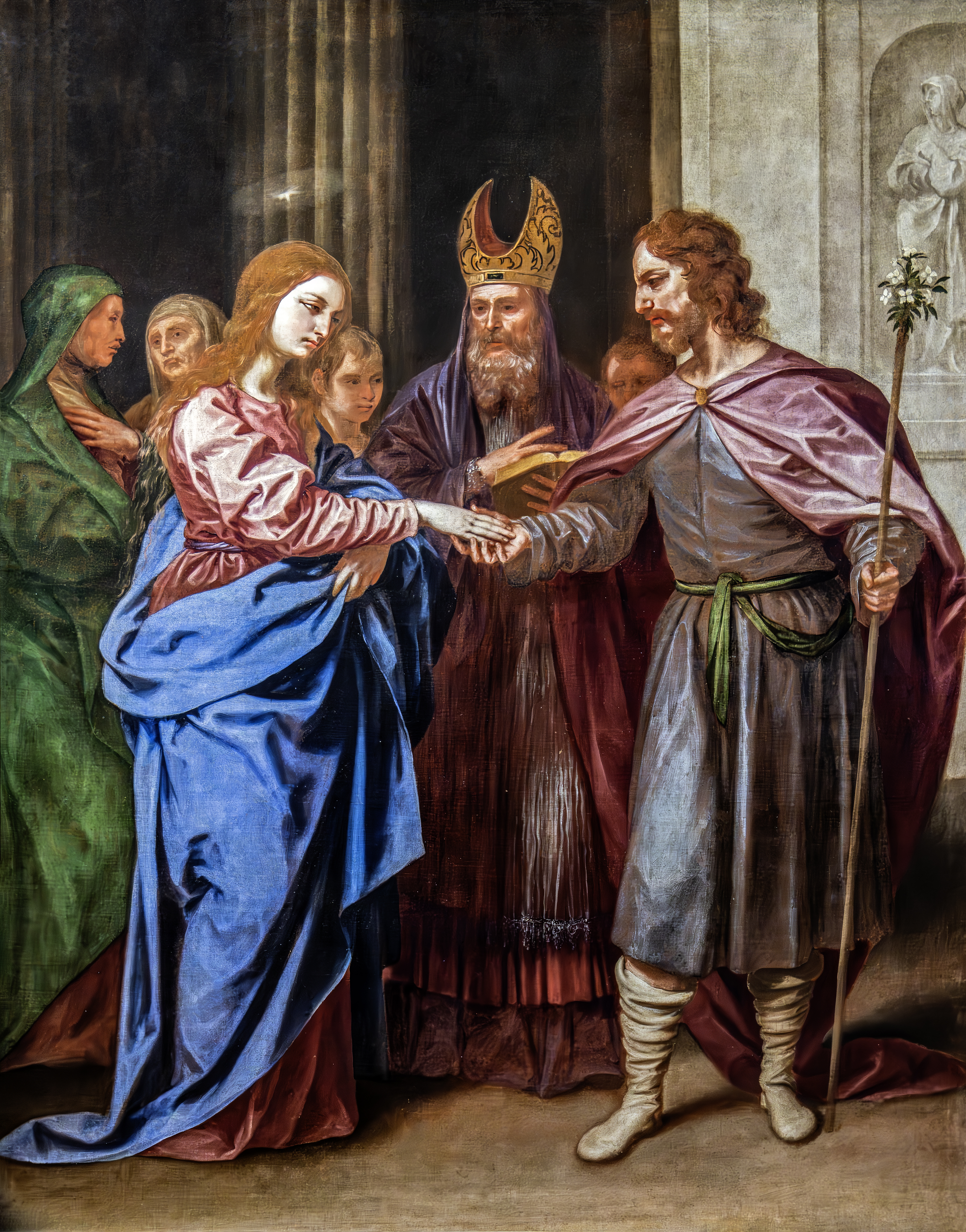
The Marriage of the Virgin, c.1655 Goya Museum.

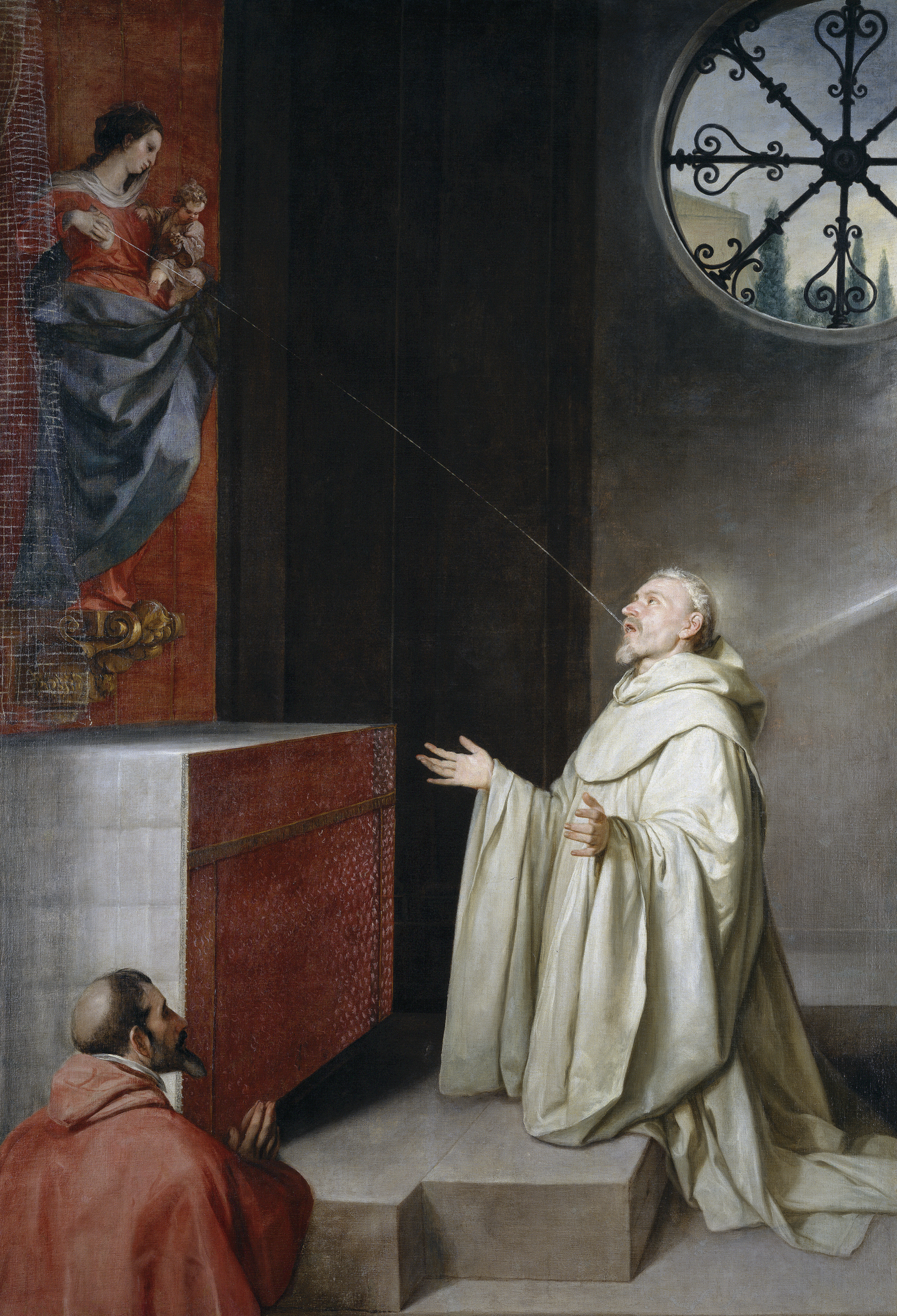
Saint Bernard, c. 1656–60

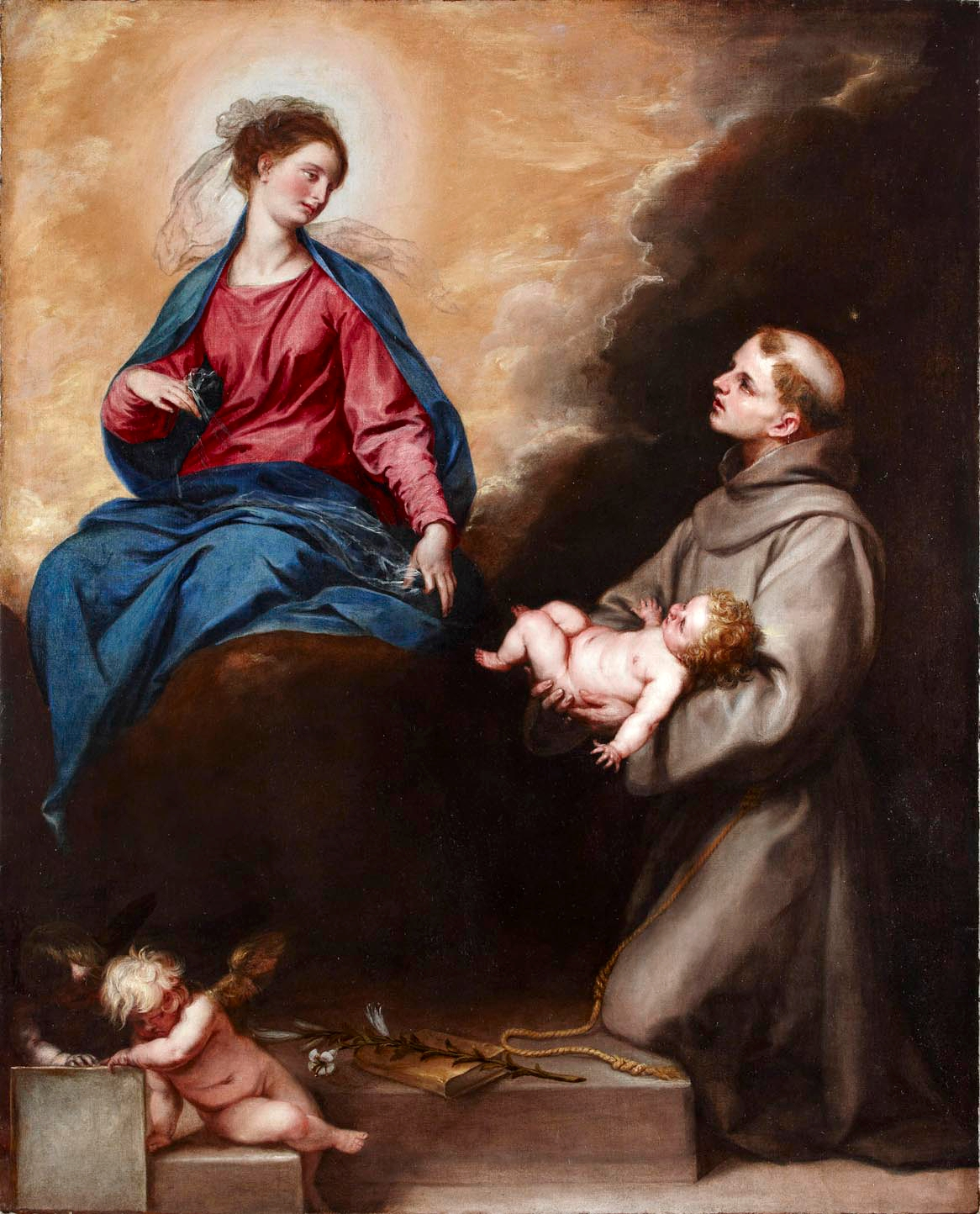
Antony of Padua, 1660–62

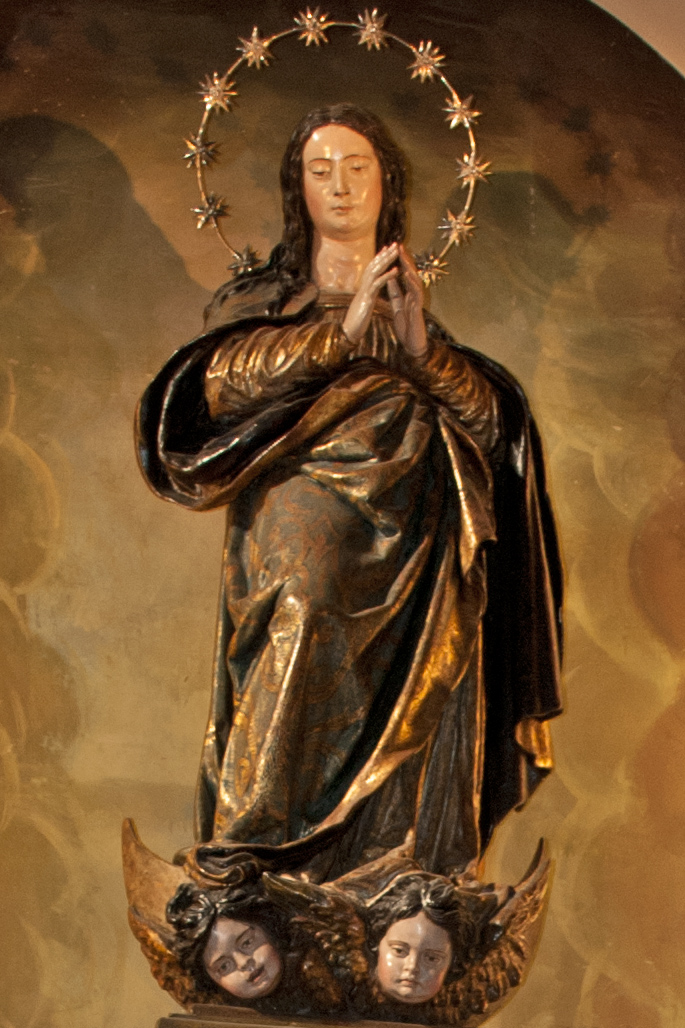
Immaculate Conception

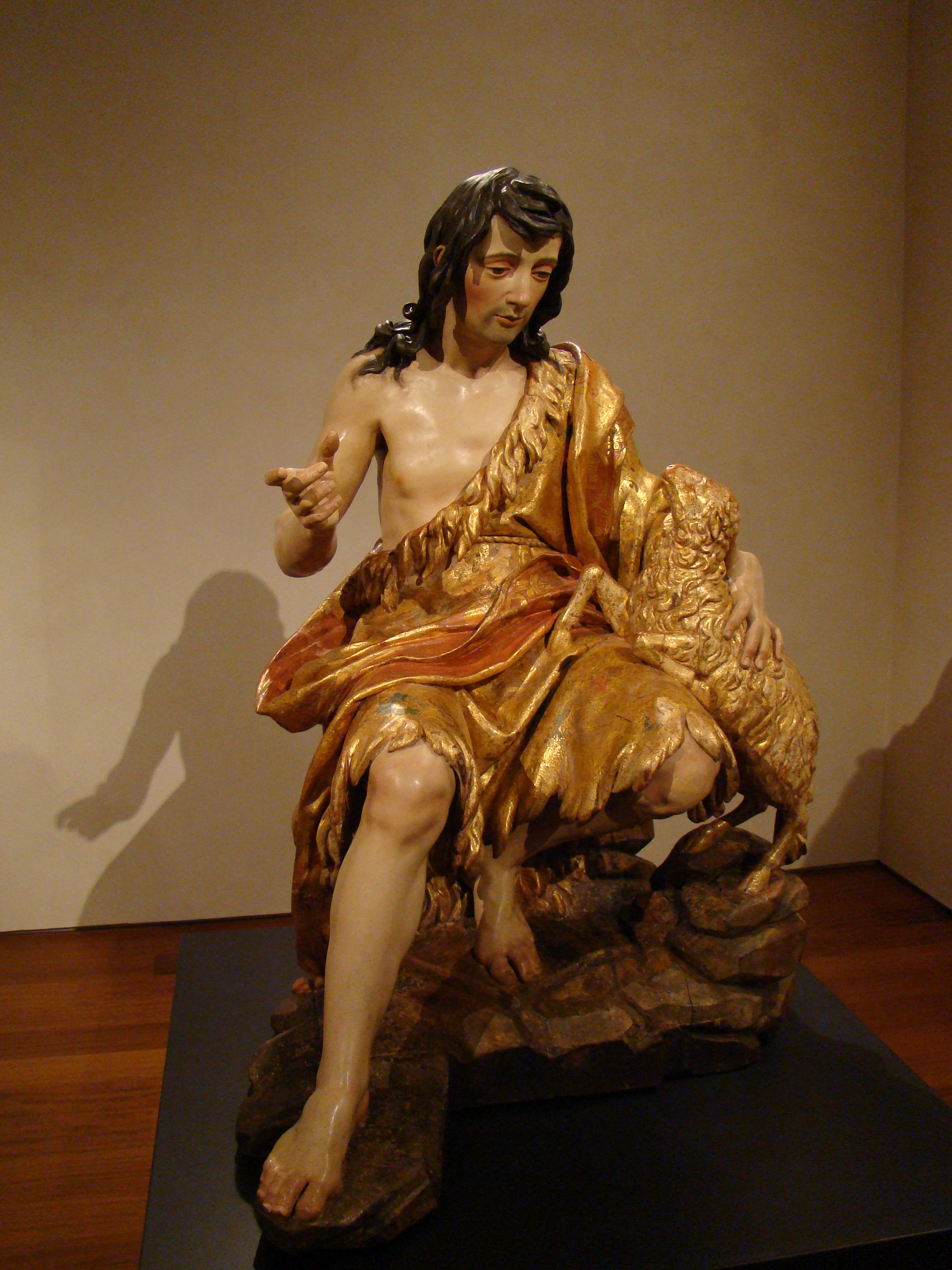
Saint John the Baptist
