= Juan Antonio de Urrutia y Arana =

Nobleman from 18th-century Spain

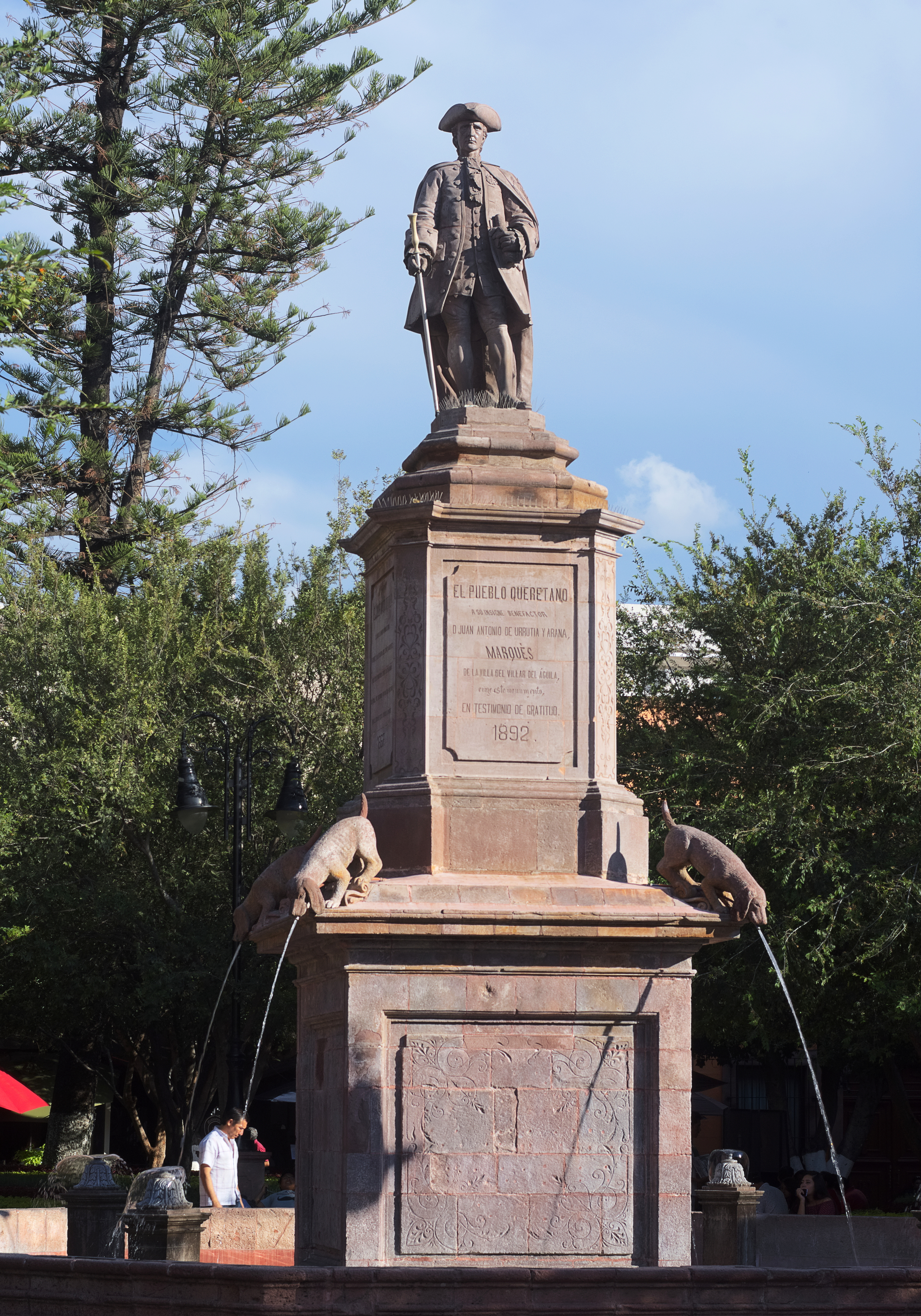
Monument to Juan Antonio de Urrutia in the Independence Plaza of Querétaro

Don Juan Antonio de Urrutia y Arana Perez de Inoriza y Chávarri was a wealthy nobleman and patron of the arts in 18th-century Querétaro, during the Viceroyalty of New Spain.

== Biography ==
He was married to María Josefa Paula Guerrero Dávila Moctezuma y Fernández del Corral.

He financed the Aqueduct of Querétaro in order to bring water to the City of Querétaro from the springs in "La Cañada" (the Ravine). The Aqueduct was constructed following a request from the city's Capuhin nuns and the Marquess was convinced by his wife (who also contributed money for the construction).

Urrutia directed the construction of La Casa de la Marquesa, (House of the Marchioness), a home for his wife. However, the couple never lived in the house, as it was completed after their deaths.
