= Miguel Cano =

Spanish baroque architect and sculptor

Miguel Cano Pacheco was a 16th- and 17th-century Spanish baroque architect and sculptor. Born in Almodóvar del Campo, he was the father and first master of Alonso Cano, renowned joiner of altarpieces. The reputation of his work and the accumulation of orders motivated that he was moving from the mancheguian city to Granada, with all his family, two months before his son Alonso was born.

== Works ==
- 1601 Altarpiece of San Ildefonso (Granada) Parish.
- 1628 Altarpiece of Nuestra Señora de la Oliva (Lebrija) Parish, finished by his son.
