= Basques =

Ethnic group native to the Basque Country

Euskaldunak (Basque) Vascos (Spanish) Basques (French) Bascos (Occitan)
- Flag of the Basque Country

Total population
- c. 3 million

Regions with significant populations
- Spain (people living in the Basque Provinces of Spain, including some areas where most people do not identify themselves as Basque): 2,410,000
- France (people living in the French Basque Country, not all of whom identify as Basque): 300,000
- United States (self-identifying as having Basque ancestry): 57,793
- Canada (including those of mixed ancestry): 7,745 For more countries, see Basque diaspora

Languages
- Basque (L1 or heritage); Spanish, French, Gascon (L2 or regional L1)

Religion
- Christianity (mostly Catholicism),

Basques (Note: /bɑːsks/ BAHSKS or /bæsks/ BASKS; Basque: euskaldunak [eus̺kaldunak]; Spanish: vascos [ˈbaskos]; French: basques [bask]) are a Southwestern European ethnic group, characterised by the Basque language, a common culture, shared genetic ancestry to the ancient Vascones and Aquitanians, and are considered among the last remaining direct descendants of Neolithic European populations in Europe.

Basques are indigenous to, and primarily inhabit, an area traditionally known as the Basque Country (Basque: Euskal Herria)—a region that is located around the western end of the Pyrenees on the coast of the Bay of Biscay and straddles parts of north-central Spain and south-western France.

== Etymology ==
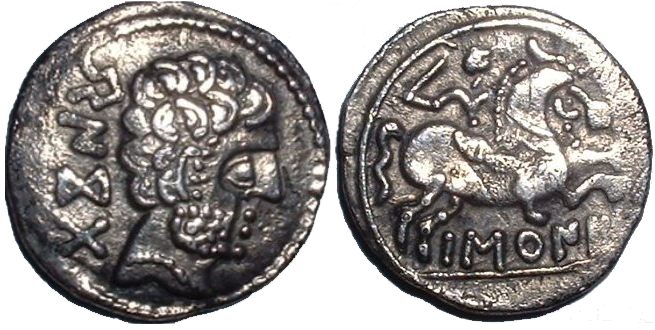
Barscunes coin, Roman period

The English word Basque may be pronounced /bɑːsk/ or /bæsk/ and derives from the French Basque (French: [bask]), itself derived from Gascon Basco (pronounced [ˈbasku]), cognate with Spanish Vasco (pronounced [ˈbasko]). Those, in turn, come from Latin Vascō (pronounced [ˈwaskoː]; plural Vascōnēs—see history section below). The Latin /w/ generally evolved into the bilabials /b/ and /β̞/ in Gascon and Spanish, probably under the influence of Basque and the related Aquitanian (the Latin /w/ instead evolved into /v/ in French, Italian and other Romance languages).

Several coins from the 2nd and the 1st centuries BC found in the Basque Country bear the inscription barscunes. The place in which they were minted is not certain but is thought to be somewhere near Pamplona, in the heartland of the area that historians believe was inhabited by the Vascones. Some scholars have suggested a Celtic etymology based on bhar-s-, meaning "summit", "point" or "leaves", according to which barscunes may have meant "the mountain people", "the tall ones" or "the proud ones", and others have posited a relationship to a Proto-Indo-European root *bar- meaning "border", "frontier", "march".

In Basque, people call themselves the euskaldunak, singular euskaldun, formed from euskal- (i.e. "Basque (language)") and -dun (i.e. "one who has"); euskaldun literally means a Basque-speaker. Not all Basques are Basque-speakers. Therefore, the neologism euskotar, plural euskotarrak, was coined in the 19th century to mean a Basque person, whether Basque-speaking or not. Alfonso Irigoyen posits that the word euskara is derived from an ancient Basque verb enautsi "to say" (compare modern Basque esan) and the suffix -(k)ara ("way (of doing something)"). Thus, euskara would mean literally "way of saying" or "way of speaking". One item of evidence in favour of that hypothesis is found in the Spanish book Compendio Historial, written in 1571 by the Basque writer Esteban de Garibay. He records the name of the Basque language as enusquera. That may, however, be a writing mistake.

In the 19th century, the Basque nationalist activist Sabino Arana posited an original root euzko, which he thought came from eguzkiko ("of the sun", related to the assumption of an original solar religion). On the basis of that putative root, Arana proposed the name Euzkadi for an independent Basque nation, composed of seven Basque historical territories. Arana's neologism Euzkadi (in the regularized spelling Euskadi) is still widely used in both Basque and Spanish since it is now the official name of the Autonomous Community of the Basque Country.

== Genetic origins ==
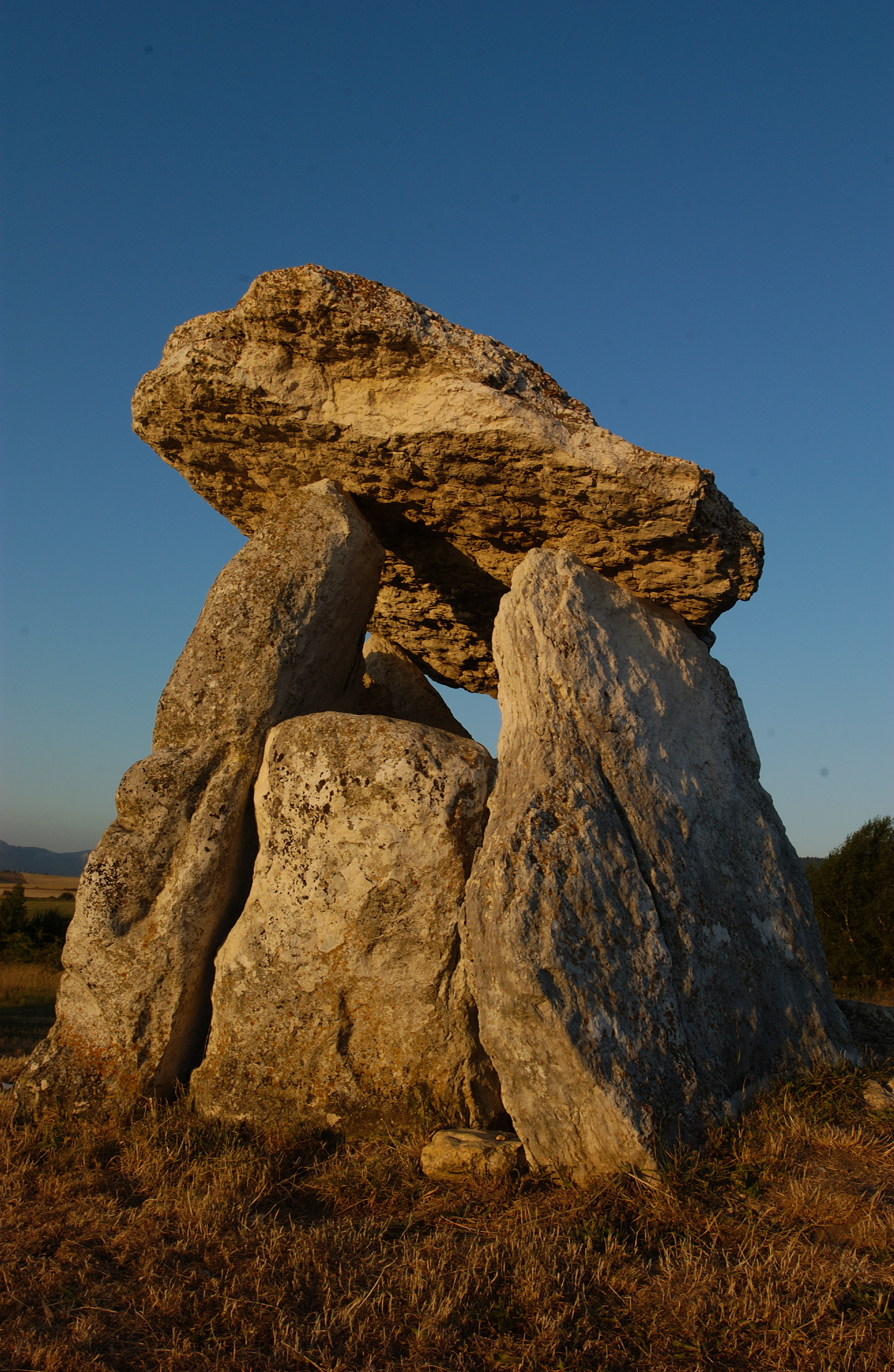
Sorginetxe dolmen next to the stream and cave Leze, home to legends featuring mythological character Mari

The distinctiveness noted by studies of classical genetic markers (such as blood groups) and the pre-Indo-European of the Basque language has resulted in a popular and long-held view that Basques are "living fossils" of the earliest modern humans who colonised Europe. Partly for these reasons, anthropological and genetic studies from the beginning and the end of the 20th century theorized that the Basques are the descendants of the original Cro-Magnons.

But although they are genetically distinctive in some ways due to isolation, the Basques are still very typically European in their Y-DNA and mtDNA sequences, and in some other genetic loci. These same sequences are widespread throughout the Western half of Europe, especially along the Western fringe of the continent.

== History ==
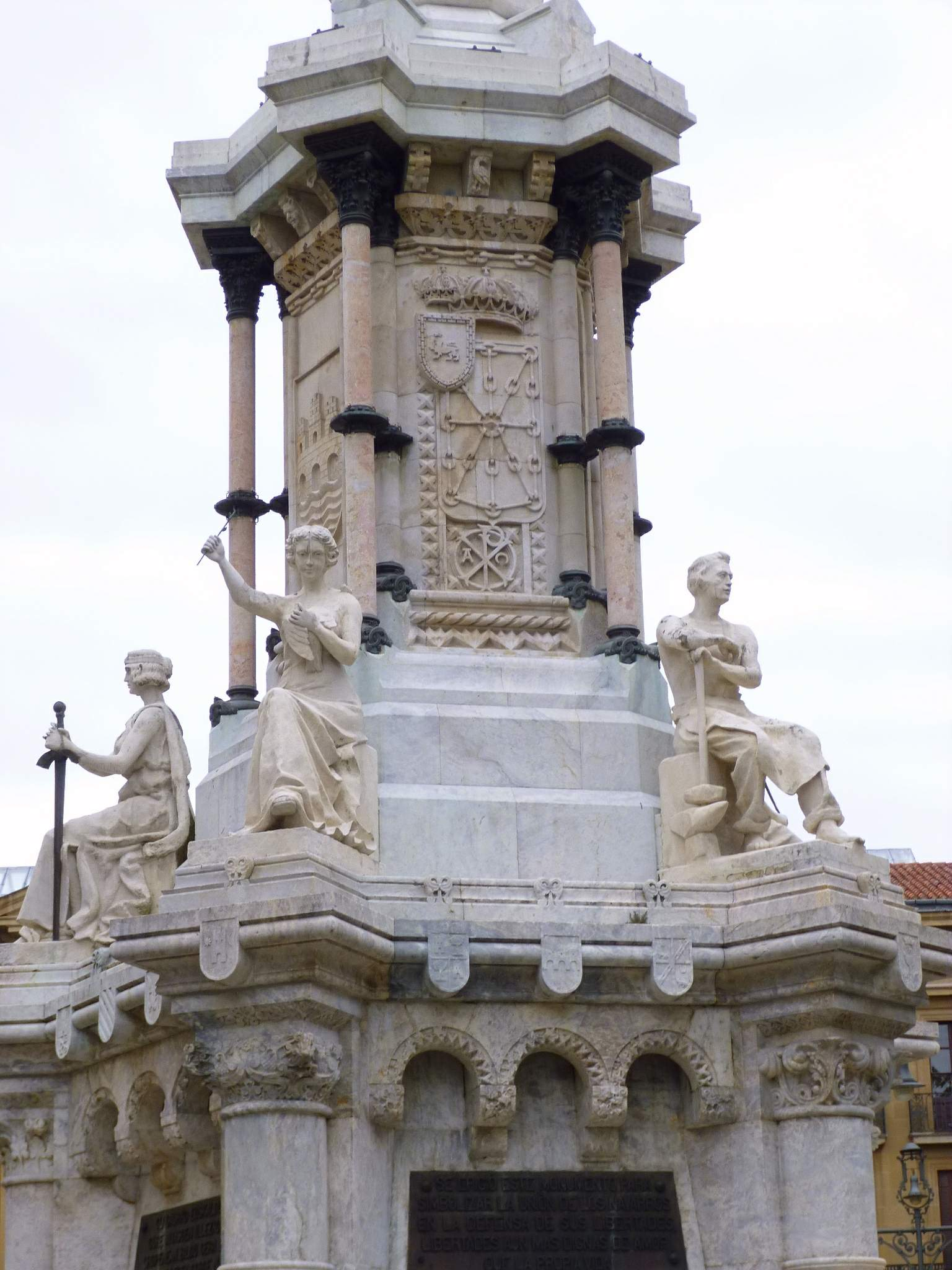
Monument to the Charters in Pamplona (1903)

Basque tribes were mentioned in Roman times by Strabo and Pliny, including the Vascones, Aquitani, and others. There is enough evidence to support the hypothesis that at that time and later they spoke old varieties of the Basque language (see: Aquitanian language).

In the Early Middle Ages, the territory between the Ebro and Garonne rivers was known as Vasconia, a vaguely defined ethnic area and political entity struggling to fend off pressure from the Iberian Visigothic kingdom and Arab rule to the south, as well as the Frankish push from the north. By the turn of the first millennium, the territory of Vasconia had fragmented into different feudal regions, such as Soule and Labourd, while south of the Pyrenees the Castile, Pamplona and the Pyrenean counties of Aragon, Sobrarbe, Ribagorça (later Kingdom of Aragon), and Pallars emerged as the main regional entities with Basque population in the 9th and 10th centuries.

The Kingdom of Pamplona, a central Basque realm, later known as Navarre, underwent a process of feudalization and was subject to the influence of its much larger Aragonese, Castilian and French neighbours. Castile deprived Navarre of its coastline by conquering key western territories (1199–1201), leaving the kingdom landlocked. The Basques were ravaged by the War of the Bands, bitter partisan wars between local ruling families. Weakened by the Navarrese civil war, the bulk of the realm eventually fell before the onslaught of the Spanish armies (1512–1524). However, the Navarrese territory north of the Pyrenees remained beyond the reach of an increasingly powerful Spain. Lower Navarre became a province of France in 1620.

Nevertheless, the Basques enjoyed a great deal of self-government until the French Revolution (1790) and the Carlist Wars (1839, 1876), when the Basques supported heir apparent Carlos V and his descendants. On either side of the Pyrenees, the Basques lost their native institutions and laws held during the Ancien régime. Since then, despite the current limited self-governing status of the Basque Autonomous Community and Navarre as settled by the Spanish Constitution, many Basques have attempted higher degrees of self-empowerment (see Basque nationalism), sometimes by acts of violence. Labourd, Lower Navarre, and Soule were integrated into the French department system (starting 1790), with Basque efforts to establish a region-specific political-administrative entity failing to take off to date. However, in January 2017, a single agglomeration community was established for the Basque Country in France.

== Geography ==
=== Political and administrative divisions ===
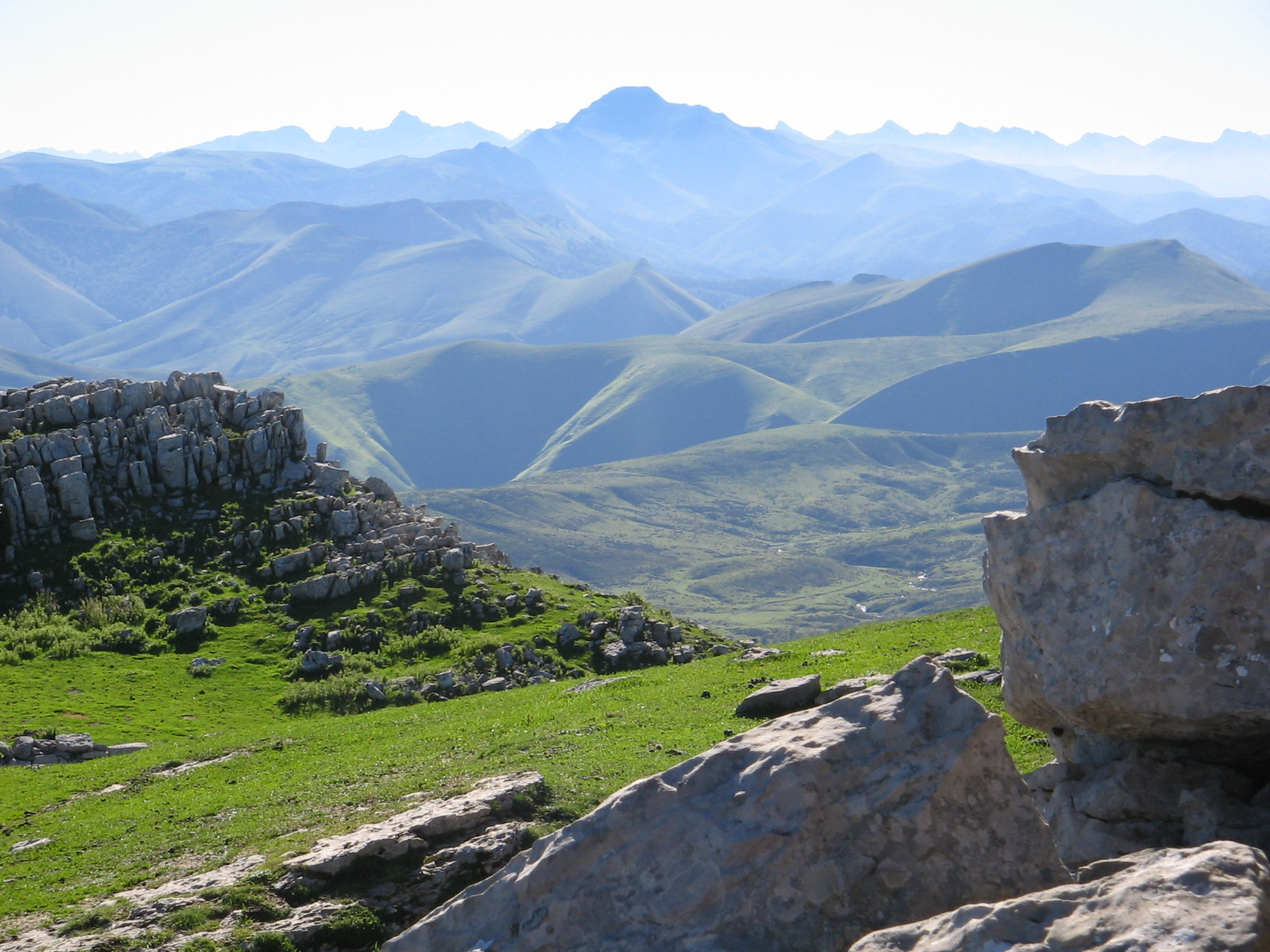
Mountains of the Basque Country

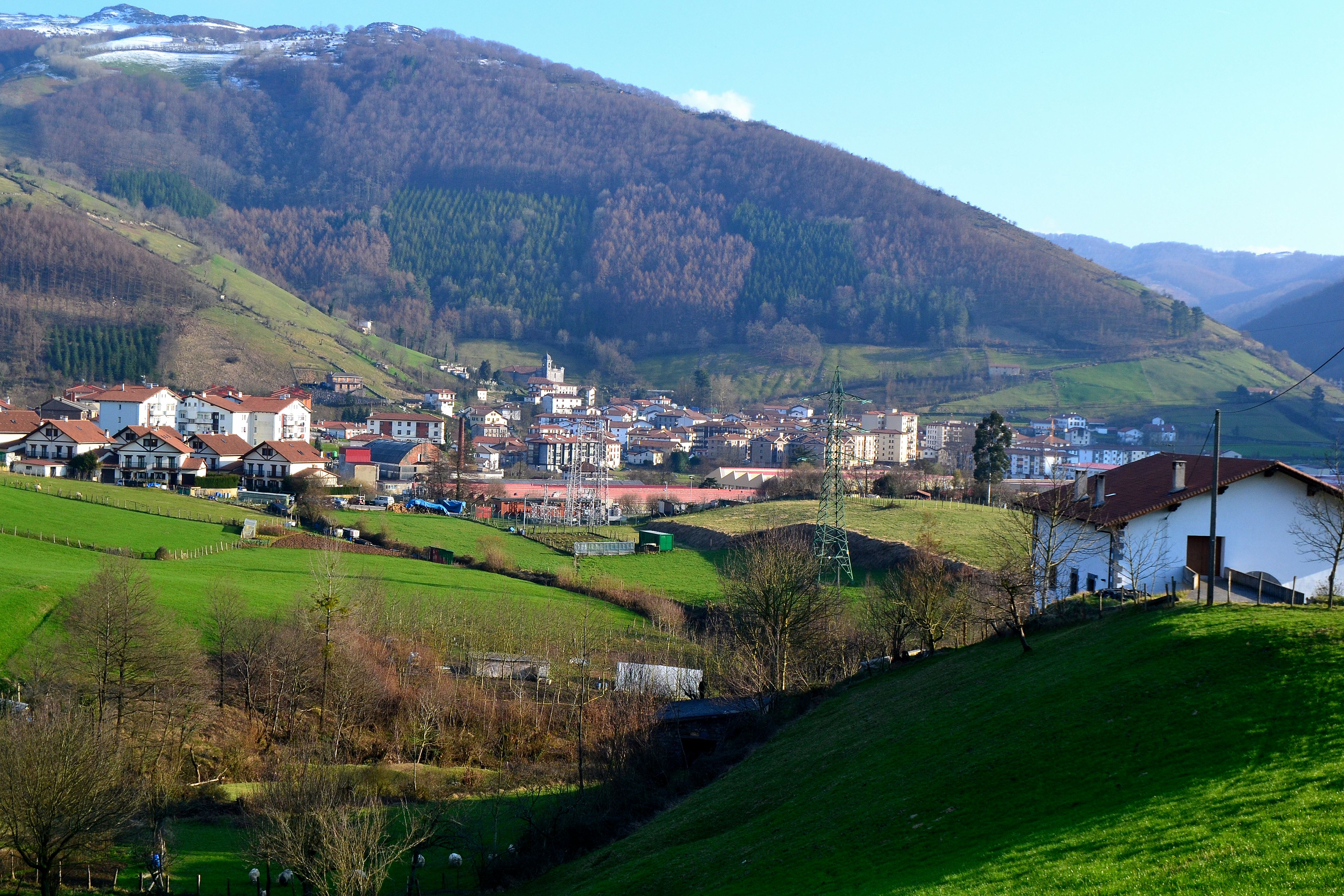
Leitza, in Navarre

The Basque region is divided into at least three administrative units, namely the Basque Autonomous Community and Navarre in Spain, and the Basque Country Agglomeration Community in the département of Pyrénées Atlantiques, France.

The autonomous community (a concept established in the Spanish Constitution of 1978) known as Euskal Autonomia Erkidegoa or EAE in Basque and as Comunidad Autónoma Vasca or CAV in Spanish (in English: Basque Autonomous Community or BAC), is made up of the three Spanish provinces of Álava, Biscay and Gipuzkoa. The corresponding Basque names of these territories are Araba, Bizkaia and Gipuzkoa, and their Spanish names are Álava, Vizcaya and Guipúzcoa.

The BAC only includes three of the seven provinces of the currently called historical territories. It is sometimes referred to simply as "the Basque Country" (or Euskadi) by writers and public agencies only considering those three western provinces, but also on occasions merely as a convenient abbreviation when this does not lead to confusion in the context. Others reject this usage as inaccurate and are careful to specify the BAC (or an equivalent expression such as "the three provinces", up to 1978 referred to as "Provincias Vascongadas" in Spanish) when referring to this entity or region. Likewise, terms such as "the Basque Government" for "the government of the BAC" are commonly though not universally employed. In particular in common usage the French term Pays Basque ("Basque Country"), in the absence of further qualification, refers either to the whole Basque Country ("Euskal Herria" in Basque), or not infrequently to the northern (or "French") Basque Country specifically.

Under Spain's present constitution, Navarre (Nafarroa in present-day Basque, Navarra historically in Spanish) constitutes a separate entity, called in present-day Basque Nafarroako Foru Erkidegoa, in Spanish Comunidad Foral de Navarra (the autonomous community of Navarre). The government of this autonomous community is the Government of Navarre. In historical contexts Navarre may refer to a wider area, and that the present-day northern Basque province of Lower Navarre may also be referred to as (part of) Nafarroa, while the term "High Navarre" (Nafarroa Garaia in Basque, Alta Navarra in Spanish) is also encountered as a way of referring to the territory of the present-day autonomous community.

There are three other historic provinces parts of the Basque Country: Labourd, Lower Navarre and Soule (Lapurdi, Nafarroa Beherea and Zuberoa in Basque; Labourd, Basse-Navarre and Soule in French), devoid of official status within France's present-day political and administrative territorial organization, and only minor political support to the Basque nationalists. A large number of regional and local nationalist and non-nationalist representatives have waged a campaign for years advocating for the creation of a separate Basque département, while these demands have gone unheard by the French administration.

=== Population, main cities, and languages ===
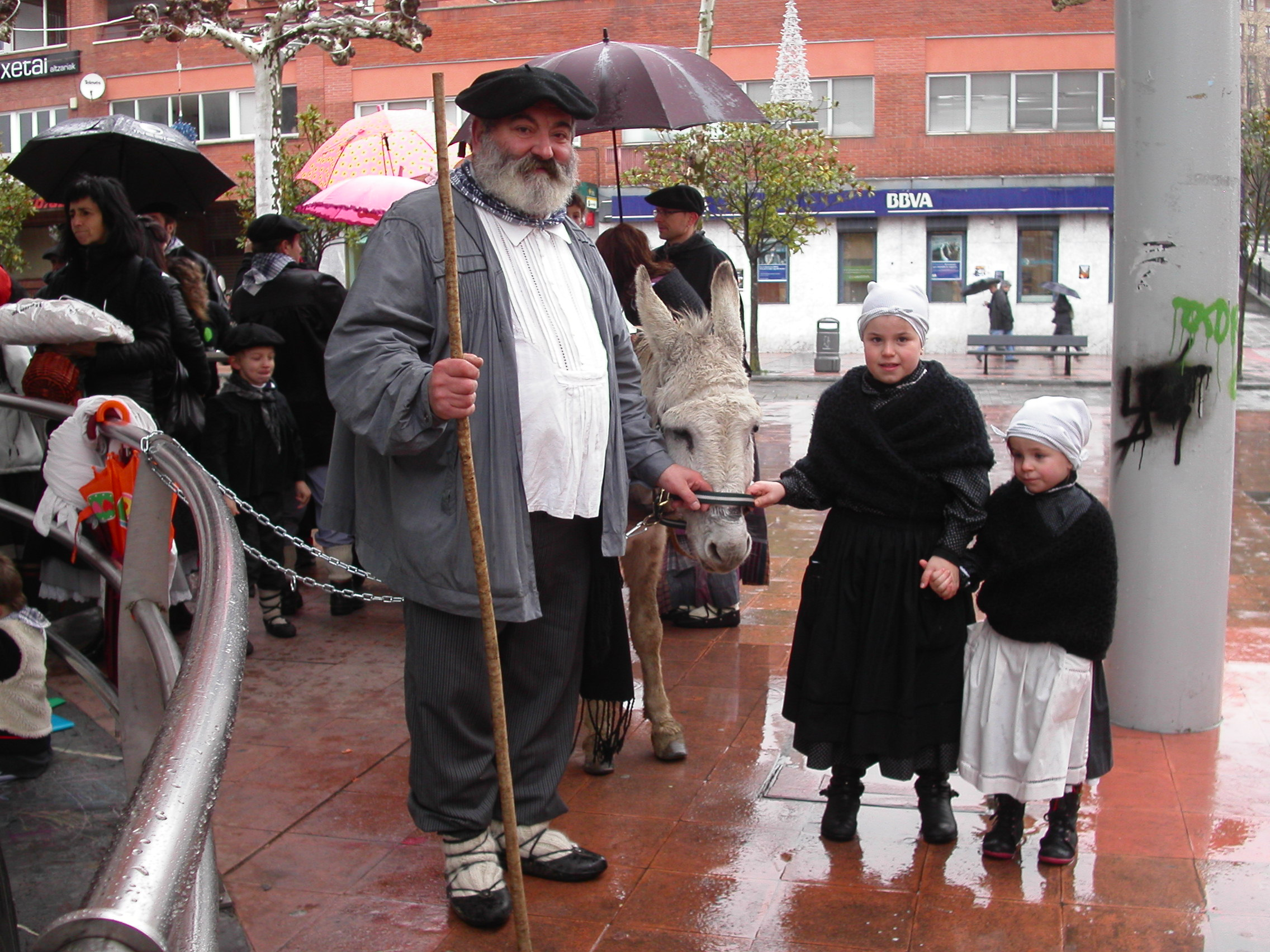
Olentzero in Gipuzkoa, Basque Country

There are 2,123,000 people living in the Basque Autonomous Community (279,000 in Alava, 1,160,000 in Biscay and 684,000 in Gipuzkoa). The most important cities in this region, which serve as the provinces' administrative centers, are Bilbao (in Biscay), San Sebastián (in Gipuzkoa), and Vitoria-Gasteiz (in Álava). The official languages are Basque and Spanish. Knowledge of Spanish is compulsory under the Spanish constitution (article no. 3), and knowledge and usage of Basque is a right under the Statute of Autonomy (article no. 6), so only knowledge of Spanish is virtually universal. Knowledge of Basque, after declining for many years during Franco's dictatorship owing to official persecution, is again on the rise due to favorable official language policies and popular support. Currently about 33 percent of the population in the Basque Autonomous Community speaks Basque.

Navarre has a population of 601,000; its administrative capital and main city, also regarded by many nationalist Basques as the Basques' historical capital, is Pamplona (Iruñea in modern Basque). Only Spanish is an official language of Navarre, and the Basque language is only co-official in the province's northern region, where the highest concentration of Basque speakers is found. In absolute figures, however, the majority of Basque speakers in the province are located outside this co-official area.

About a quarter of a million people live in the French Basque Country. Nowadays Basque-speakers refer to this region as Iparralde (Basque for North), and to the Spanish provinces as Hegoalde (South). Much of this population lives in or near the Bayonne-Anglet-Biarritz (BAB) urban belt on the coast (in Basque these are Baiona, Angelu and Miarritze). The Basque language, which was traditionally spoken by most of the region's population outside the BAB urban zone, is today rapidly losing ground to French. The French Basque Country's lack of self-government within the French state is coupled with the absence of official status for the Basque language in the region. Attempts to introduce bilingualism in local administration have so far met direct refusal from French officials.

== Basque diaspora ==
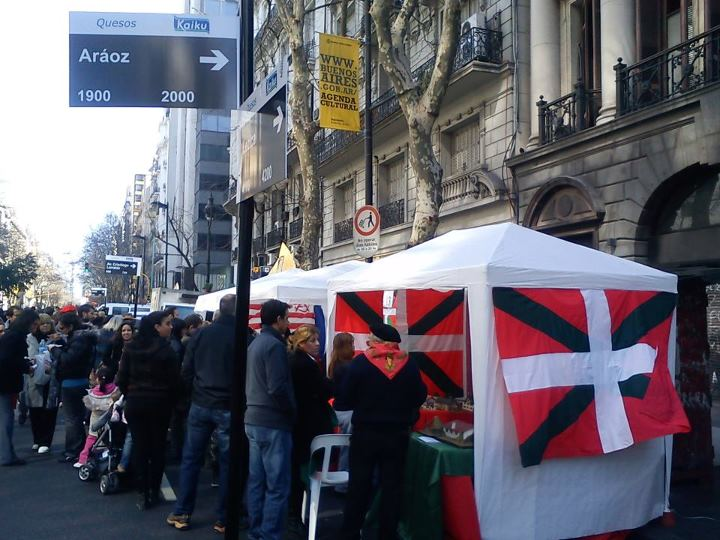
Basque festival in Buenos Aires, Argentina

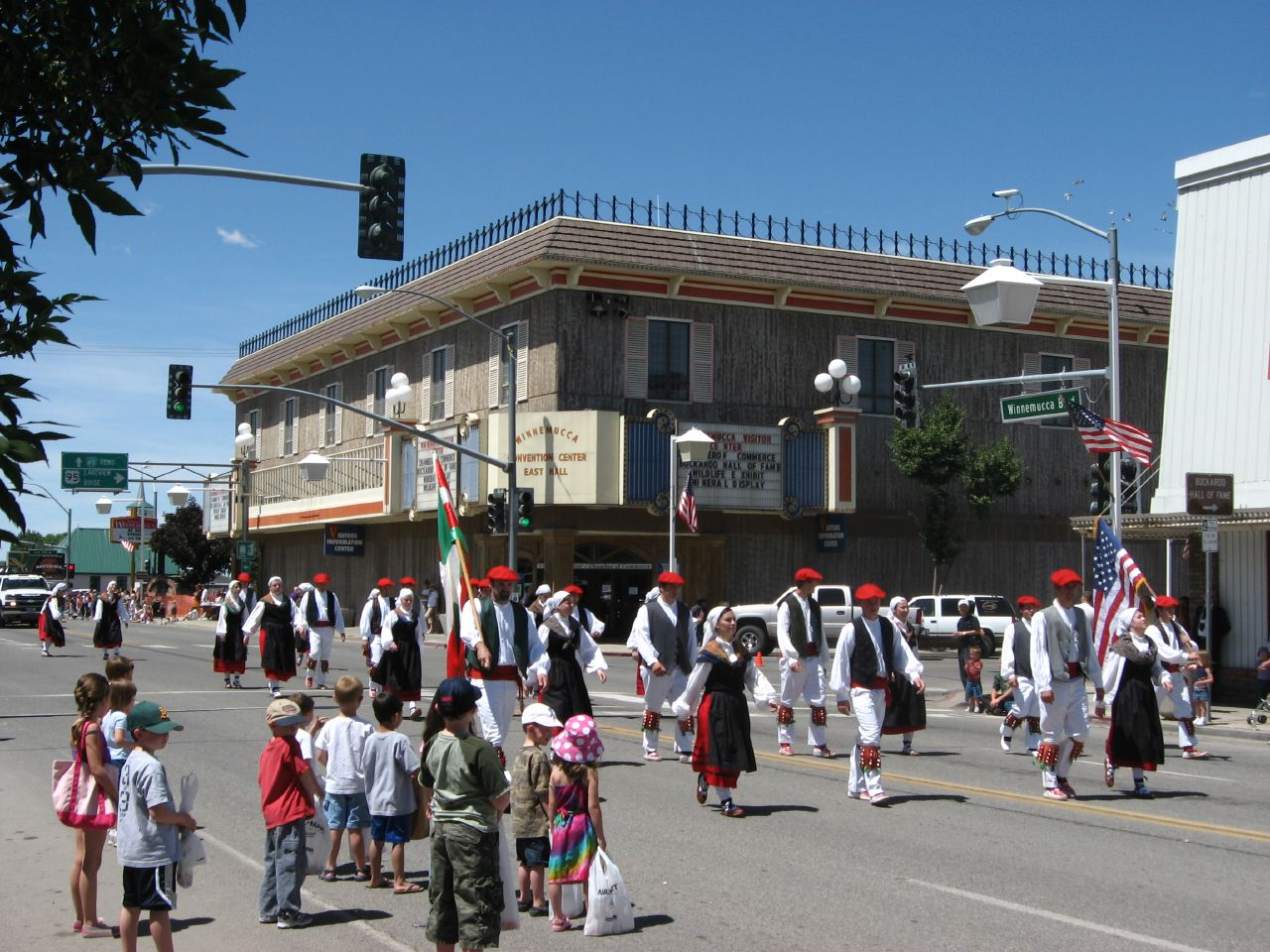
Basque festival in Winnemucca, Nevada, United States

Large numbers of Basques have left the Basque Country to settle in the rest of Spain, France or other parts of the world in different historical periods, often for economic or political reasons. Historically the Basques abroad were often employed in shepherding and ranching and by maritime fisheries and merchants. Millions of Basque descendants (see Basque American and Basque Canadian) live in North America (the United States; Canada, mainly in the provinces of Newfoundland and Quebec), all over Latin America, South Africa, and Australia.

=== Latin America ===
Spanish author Miguel de Unamuno said: "There are at least two things that clearly can be attributed to Basques: the Society of Jesus and the Republic of Chile." Chilean historian Luis Thayer Ojeda estimated that 48 percent of immigrants to Chile in the 17th and 18th centuries were Basque. Estimates for the number of Basque descendants living in Chile range between 2.5 and 5 million; the Basque have been a major, if not the strongest, influence in the country's cultural and economic development.

In Bolivia, the War of the Vicuñas and Basques (Spanish: Guerra de Vicuñas y Vascongados), was an armed conflict in Charcas Province that lasted between June 1622 and March 1625, fought between Basques and "Vicuñas"; an informal term for non-Basque Spaniards in Upper Peru, a name obtained through the habit of wearing hats made of vicuña skins. Competition over the control of the silver mines in Potosí, Lípez and Chichas surged in the early 17th century, pitting Basques and Vicuñas against each other. The Vicuñas had initially employed legal and political measures attempting to block the Basque attempts to monopolize control over the cabildo (municipal government) of Potosí and the silver mining sector. The war pitted different sectors of the viceregal administration against each other, as some supported the Basque claims for hegemony whilst others had a conciliatory approach to the Vicuña rebels. Personalities involved in the conflict included the president and oidores of the Royal Audiencia of Charcas, treasury officials and the corregidor of Potosí and the visitador (sent to the area in order to audit fiscal accounts).

Basque place names are to be found in the Americas, such as Nueva Vizcaya (now Chihuahua and Durango, Mexico), New Navarre (now Sonora and Sinaloa, Mexico), Biscayne Bay (United States), and Aguereberry Point (United States). Nueva Vizcaya was the first province in the north of the Viceroyalty of New Spain (Mexico) to be explored and settled by the Spanish. It consisted mostly of the area which is today the states of Chihuahua and Durango (the original Durango is a known city in Biscay).

In Mexico most descendants of Basque émigrés are concentrated in the cities of Monterrey, Saltillo, Reynosa, Camargo, and the states of Jalisco, Durango, Nuevo León, Tamaulipas, Coahuila, and Sonora. The Basques were important in the mining industry; many were ranchers and vaqueros (cowboys), and the rest opened small shops in major cities such as Mexico City, Guadalajara and Puebla. In Guatemala, most Basques have been concentrated in Sacatepequez Department, Antigua Guatemala, Jalapa for six generations now, while some have migrated to Guatemala City.

In Colombia, a large number of Basques settled mainly in Antioquia and the Coffee Axis. In 1955, Joaquín Ospina said: "Is there something more similar to the Basque people than the "antioqueños". Also, writer Arturo Escobar Uribe said in his book "Mitos de Antioquia" (Myths of Antioquia) (1950): "Antioquia, which in its clean ascendance predominates the peninsular farmer of the Basque provinces, inherited the virtues of its ancestors. ... Despite the predominance of the white race, its extension in the mountains ... has projected over Colombia's map the prototype of its race; in Medellín with the industrial paisa, entrepreneur, strong and steady ... in its towns, the adventurer, arrogant, world-explorer. ... Its myths, which are an evidence of their deep credulity and an indubitable proof of their Iberian ancestor, are the sequel of the conqueror's blood which runs through their veins". Bambuco, a Colombian folk music, has Basque roots.

=== United States ===
The largest of several important Basque communities in the United States is in the area around Boise, Idaho, home to the Basque Museum and Cultural Center, host to an annual Basque festival, as well as a festival for the Basque diaspora every five years. Reno, Nevada, where the Center for Basque Studies and the Basque Studies Library are located at the University of Nevada, is another significant nucleus of Basque population. Elko, Nevada, sponsors an annual Basque festival that celebrates the dance, cuisine and cultures of the Basque peoples of Spanish, French and Mexican nationalities who have arrived in Nevada since the late 19th century.

Texas has a large percentage of Hispanics descended from Basques who participated in the conquest of New Spain. Many of the original Tejanos had Basque blood, including those who fought in the Battle of the Alamo alongside many of the other Texans. Along the Mexican/Texan border, many Basque surnames can be found. The largest concentration of Basques who settled on Mexico's north-eastern "frontera", including the states of Chihuahua, Durango, Coahuila, Nuevo León, and Tamaulipas, also settled along Texas' Rio Grande from South Texas to West Texas. Many of the historic hidalgos, or noble families from this area, had gained their titles and land grants from Spain and Mexico; they still value their land. Some of North America's largest ranches, which were founded under these colonial land grants, can be found in this region.

California has a major concentration of Basques, most notably in the San Joaquin Valley between Stockton, Fresno and Bakersfield. The city of Bakersfield has a large Basque community and the city has several Basque restaurants, including Noriega's which won the 2011 James Beard Foundation America's Classic Award. There is a history of Basque culture in Chino, California. In Chino, two annual Basque festivals celebrate the dance, cuisine, and culture of the peoples. The surrounding area of San Bernardino County has many Basque descendants as residents. They are mostly descendants of settlers from Spain and Mexico. These Basques in California are grouped in the group known as Californios.

Basques of European Spanish-French and Latin American nationalities also settled throughout the western U.S. in states like Louisiana, New Mexico, Arizona, Utah, Colorado, Wyoming, Montana, Oregon, and Washington.

== Culture ==
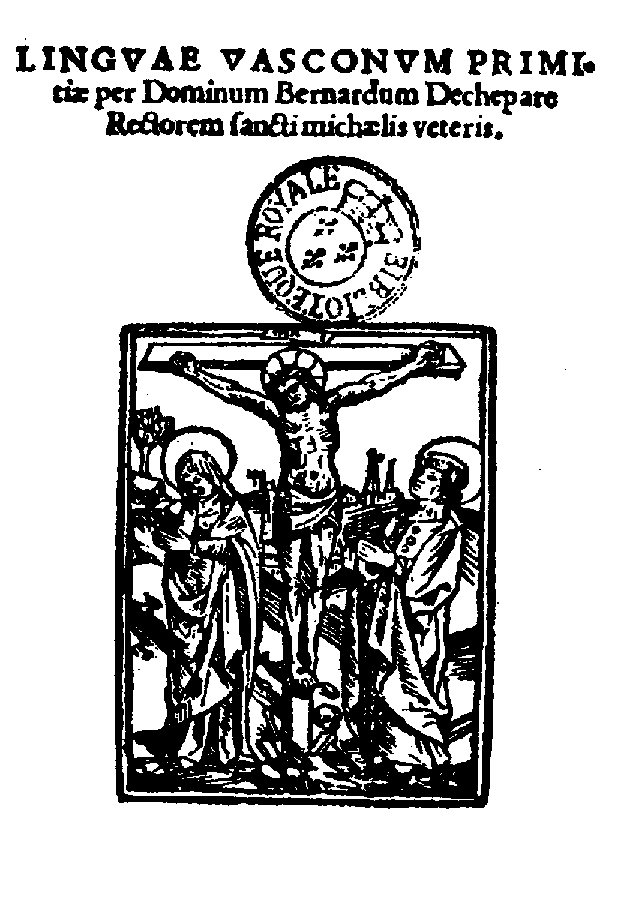
Cover of the first Basque language book, written by Bernard Etxepare

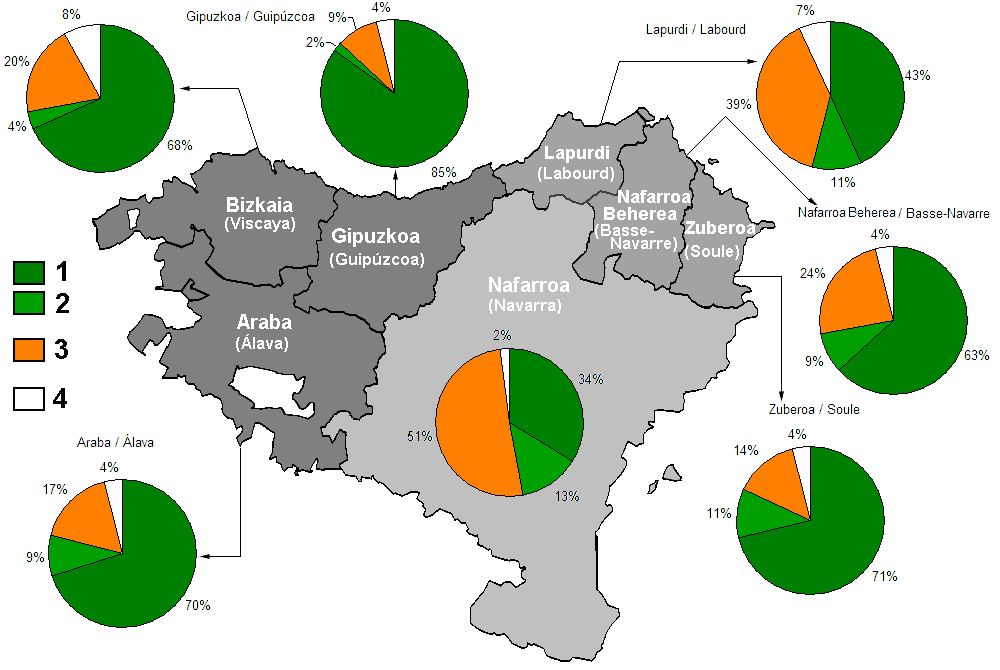
Cultural identity according to the 1981 and 1991 census based on the question Do you consider yourself Basque? 1 - Yes 2 - Yes, in some ways 3 - No 4 - Don't know / Don't answer

=== Language ===
The identifying language of the Basques is called Basque or Euskara, spoken today by 25-30% of the region's population. An idea of the central place the language has in cultural terms is given by the fact that Basques identify themselves by the term euskaldun and their country as Euskal Herria, literally "Basque speaker" and "Country of the Basque Language" respectively. The language has been made a political issue by official Spanish and French policies restricting its use either historically or currently; however, this has not stopped the teaching, speaking, writing, and cultivating of this minority language. This sense of Basque identity tied to the local language does not only exist in isolation. For many Basques, it is juxtaposed with a sense of either Spanish or French identity tied with the use of the Spanish and French languages among other Basques, especially in the French Basque Country. Regarding the Spanish Basque Country, Basques that don't have a sense of Spanish identity make up an important part of the population. As with many European states, a regional identity, be it linguistically derived or otherwise, is not mutually exclusive with the broader national one. For example, Basque rugby union player for France, Imanol Harinordoquy, has said about his national identity:

I am French and Basque. There is no conflict, I am proud of both ... I have friends who are involved in the political side of things but that is not for me. My only interest is the culture, the Euskera language, the people, our history and ways.

As a result of state language promotion, school policies, the effects of mass media and migration, today virtually all Basques (except for some children below school age) speak the official language of their state (Spanish or French). There are extremely few Basque monolingual speakers: essentially all Basque speakers are bilingual on both sides of the border. Spanish or French is typically the first language of citizens from other regions (who often feel no need to learn Basque), and Spanish or French is also the first language of many Basques, all of which maintains the dominance of the state tongues of both France and Spain. Recent Basque Government policies aim to change this pattern, as they are viewed as potential threats against mainstream usage of the minority tongue.

The Basque language is thought to be a genetic language isolate in contrast with other European languages, the vast majority of which belong to the broad Indo-European language family. Another peculiarity of Basque is that it has probably been spoken continuously in situ, in and around its present territorial location, for longer than most other modern European languages, which are typically thought to have been introduced in historic or prehistoric times through population migrations or other processes of cultural transmission.

However, popular stereotypes characterizing Basque as "the oldest language in Europe" and "unique among the world's languages" may be misunderstood and lead to erroneous assumptions. Over the centuries, Basque has remained in continuous contact with neighboring western European languages with which it has come to share numerous lexical properties and typological features. Basque is also a modern language, and is established as a written and printed one used in present-day forms of publication and communication, as well as a language spoken and used in a very wide range of social and cultural contexts, styles, and registers.

=== Land and inheritance ===
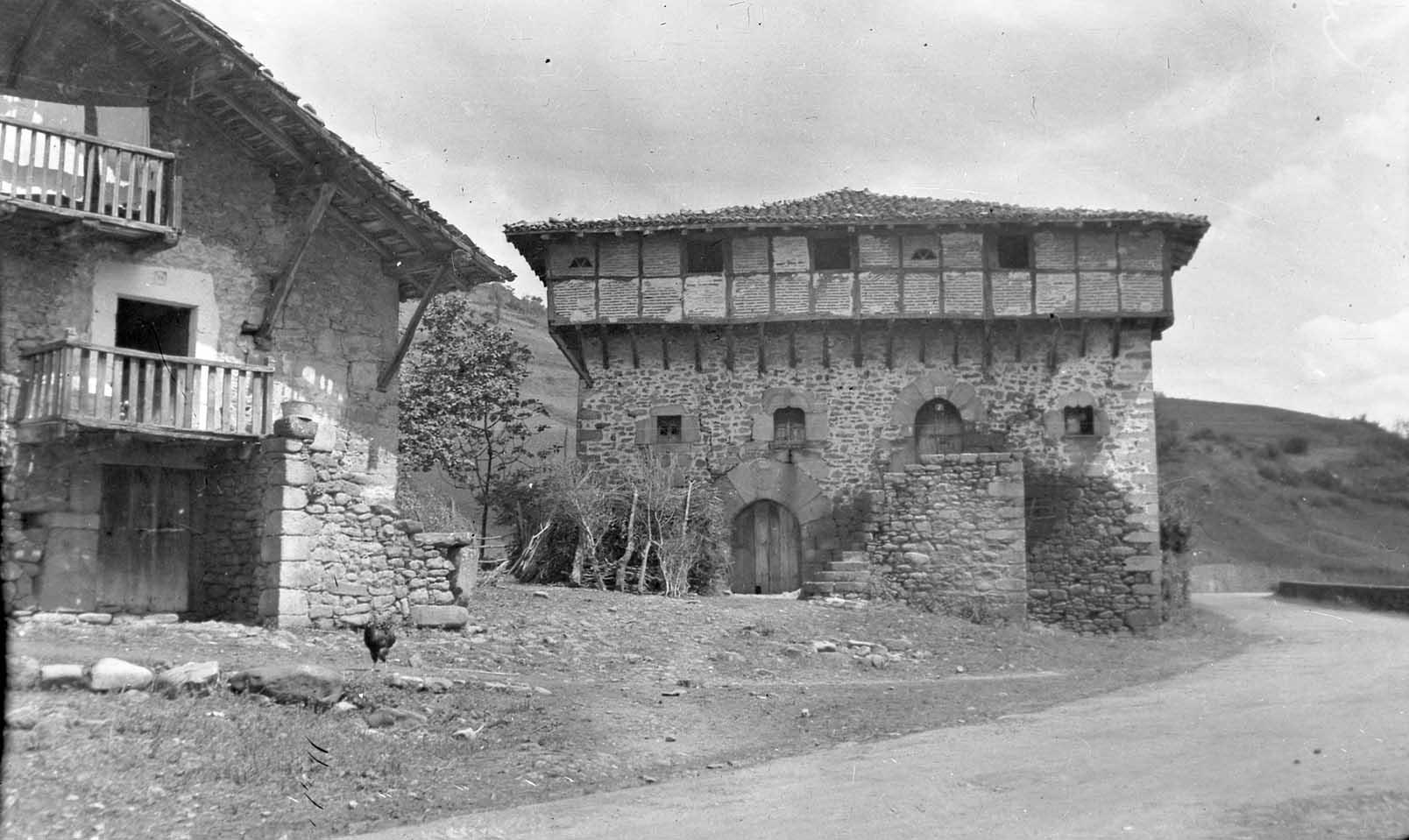
The Aranguren baserri in Orozko, converted from a fortified tower

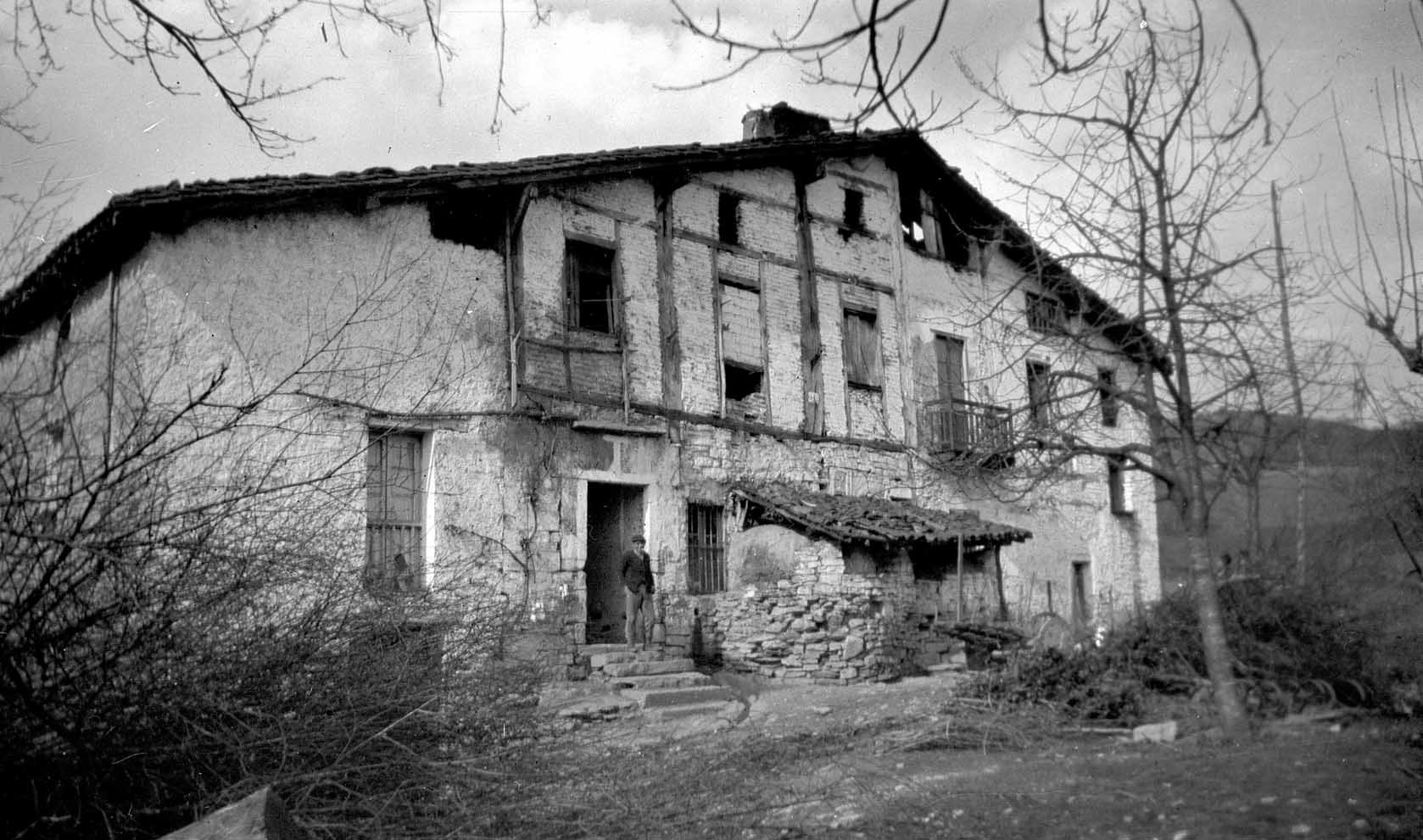
The Lizarralde baserri (Bergara)

Basques have a close attachment to their home (etxe(a) 'house, home'), especially when this consists of the traditional self-sufficient, family-run farm or baserri(a). Home in this context is synonymous with family roots. Some Basque surnames were adapted from old baserri or habitation names. They typically related to a geographical orientation or other locally meaningful identifying features. Such surnames provide even those Basques whose families may have left the land generations ago with an important link to their rural family origins: Bengoetxea "the house of further down", Goikoetxea "the house above", Landaburu "top of the field", Errekondo "next to the stream", Elizalde "by the church", Mendizabal "wide hill", Usetxe "house of birds" Ibarretxe "house in the valley", Etxeberria "the new house", and so on.

In contrast to surrounding regions, ancient Basque inheritance patterns, recognised in the fueros, favoured survival of the unity of inherited land holdings. In a kind of primogeniture, these usually were inherited by the eldest male or female child. As in other cultures, the fate of other family members depended on the assets of a family: wealthy Basque families tended to provide for all children in some way, while less-affluent families may have had only one asset to provide for one child. However, this heir often provided for the rest of the family (unlike in England, with strict primogeniture, where the eldest son inherited everything and often did not provide for others). Even though they were provided for in some way, younger siblings had to make much of their living by other means. Mostly after the advent of industrialisation, this system resulted in the emigration of many rural Basques to Spain, France or the Americas. Harsh by modern standards, this custom resulted in a great many enterprising figures of Basque origin who went into the world to earn their way, from Spanish conquistadors such as Lope de Aguirre and Francisco Vásquez de Coronado, to explorers, missionaries and saints of the Catholic Church, such as Francis Xavier.

A widespread belief that Basque society was originally matriarchal is at odds with the current, clearly patrilineal kinship system and inheritance structures. Some scholars and commentators have attempted to reconcile these points by assuming that patrilineal kinship represents an innovation. In any case, the social position of women in both traditional and modern Basque society is somewhat better than in neighbouring cultures, and women have a substantial influence in decisions about the domestic economy. In the past, some women participated in collective magical ceremonies. They were key participants in a rich folklore, today largely forgotten.

=== Cuisine ===
Basque cuisine is at the heart of Basque culture, influenced by the neighboring communities and produce from the sea and the land. A 20th-century feature of Basque culture is the phenomenon of gastronomical societies (called txoko in Basque), food clubs where men gather to cook and enjoy their own food. Until recently, women were allowed entry only one day in the year. Cider houses (Sagardotegiak) are popular restaurants in Gipuzkoa open for a few months while the cider is in season.

=== Cultural production ===
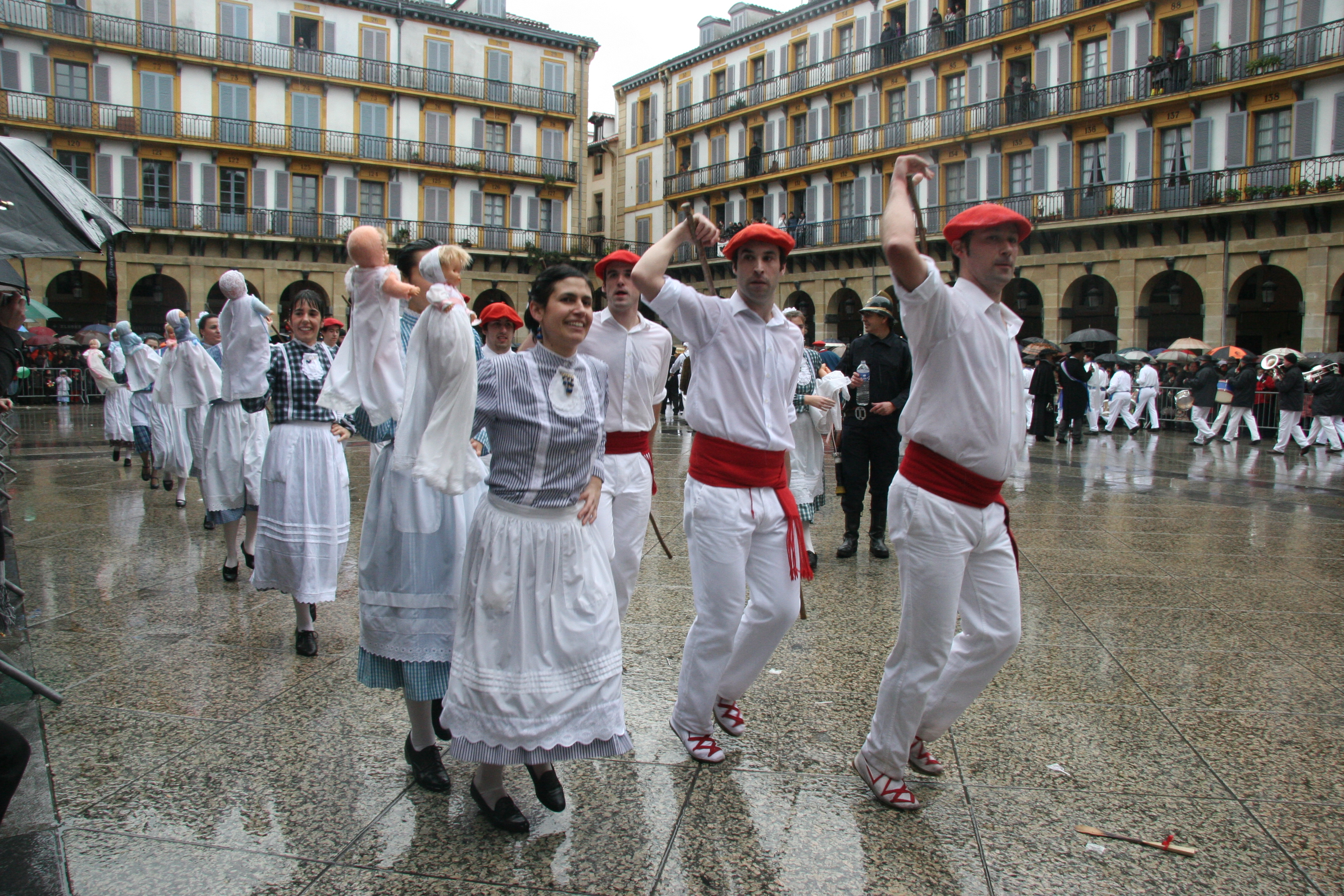
Artzaiak eta inudeak festival, San Sebastián, Basque Country

At the end of the 20th century, despite ETA violence (ended in 2010) and the crisis of heavy industries, the Basque economic condition recovered remarkably. They emerged from the Franco regime with a revitalized language and culture. The Basque language expanded geographically, led by a significant increase in its usage among the major urban centers of Pamplona, Bilbao, and Bayonne, where only a few decades prior the Basque language had all but disappeared. Nowadays, the number of Basque speakers is maintaining its level or increasing slightly.

=== Music ===
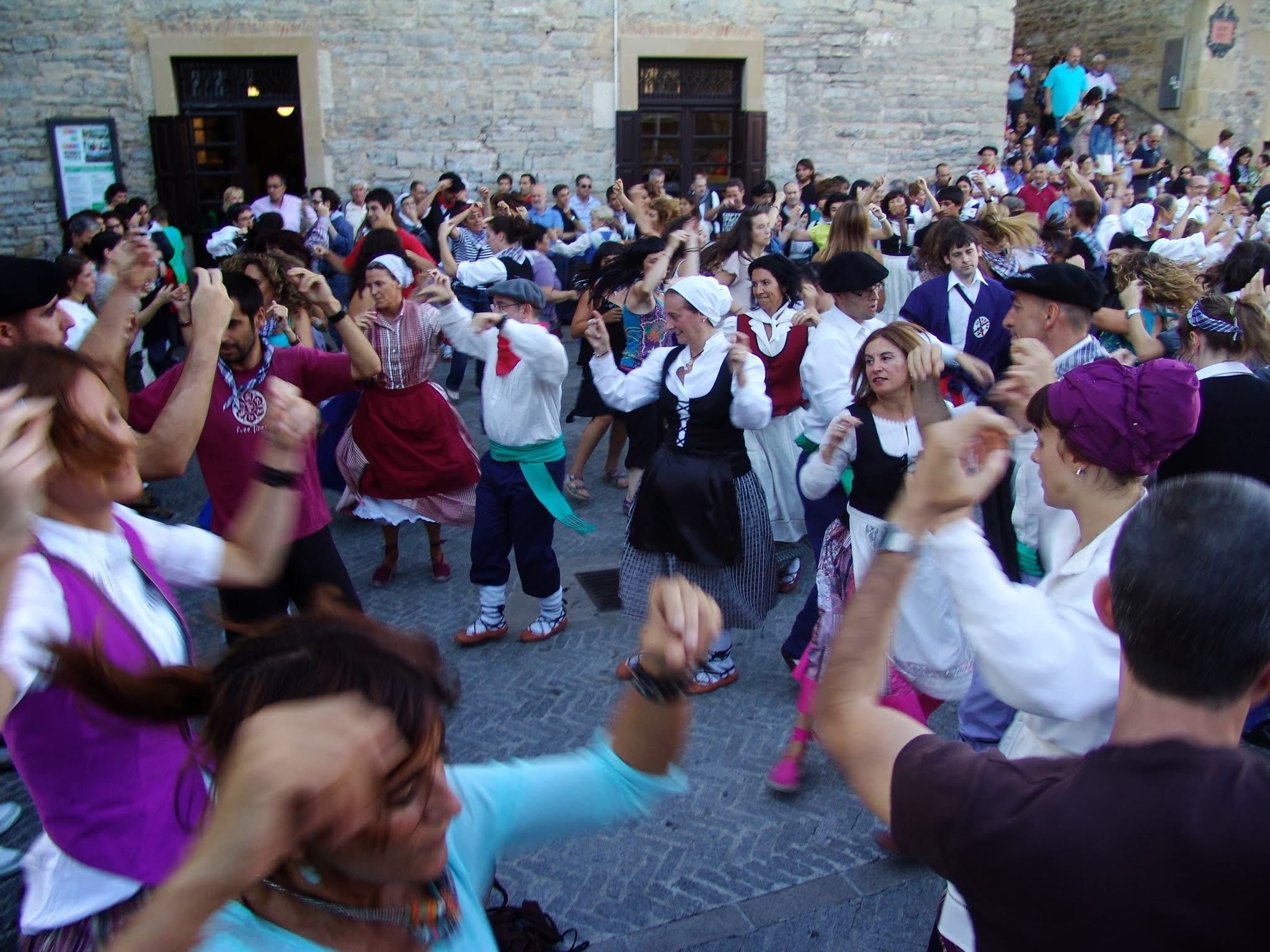
Basque dance

=== Religion ===
Traditionally Basques have been mostly Catholics. In the 19th century and well into the 20th, Basques as a group remained notably devout and churchgoing. In recent years church attendance has fallen off, as in most of Western Europe. The region has been a source of missionaries like Francis Xavier and Michel Garicoïts. Ignatius Loyola, founder of the Society of Jesus, was a Basque. California Franciscan Fermín Lasuén was born in Vitoria. Lasuén was the successor to Franciscan Padre Junípero Serra and founded 9 of the 21 extant California Missions along the coast.

A sprout of Protestantism in the continental Basque Country produced the first translation of the new Testament into Basque by Joanes Leizarraga. Queen Jeanne III of Navarre, a devout Huguenot, commissioned the translation of the New Testament into Basque and Béarnese for the benefit of her subjects. By the time Henry III of Navarre converted to Catholicism in order to become king of France, Protestantism virtually disappeared from the Basque community.

Bayonne held a Jewish community composed mainly of Sephardi Jews fleeing from the Spanish and Portuguese Inquisitions. There were also important Jewish and Muslim communities in Navarre before the Castilian invasion of 1512–21.

Nowadays, according to one single opinion poll, only slightly more than 50% of Basques profess some kind of belief in God, while the rest are either agnostic or atheist. The number of religious skeptics increases noticeably for the younger generations, while the older ones are more religious. Catholicism is, by far, the largest religion in the Basque Country. In 2019, the proportion of Basques that identify themselves as Roman Catholic was 60%, while it is one of the most secularized communities of Spain: 24.6% were non-religious and 12.3% of Basques were atheist.

==== Pre-Christian religion and mythology ====
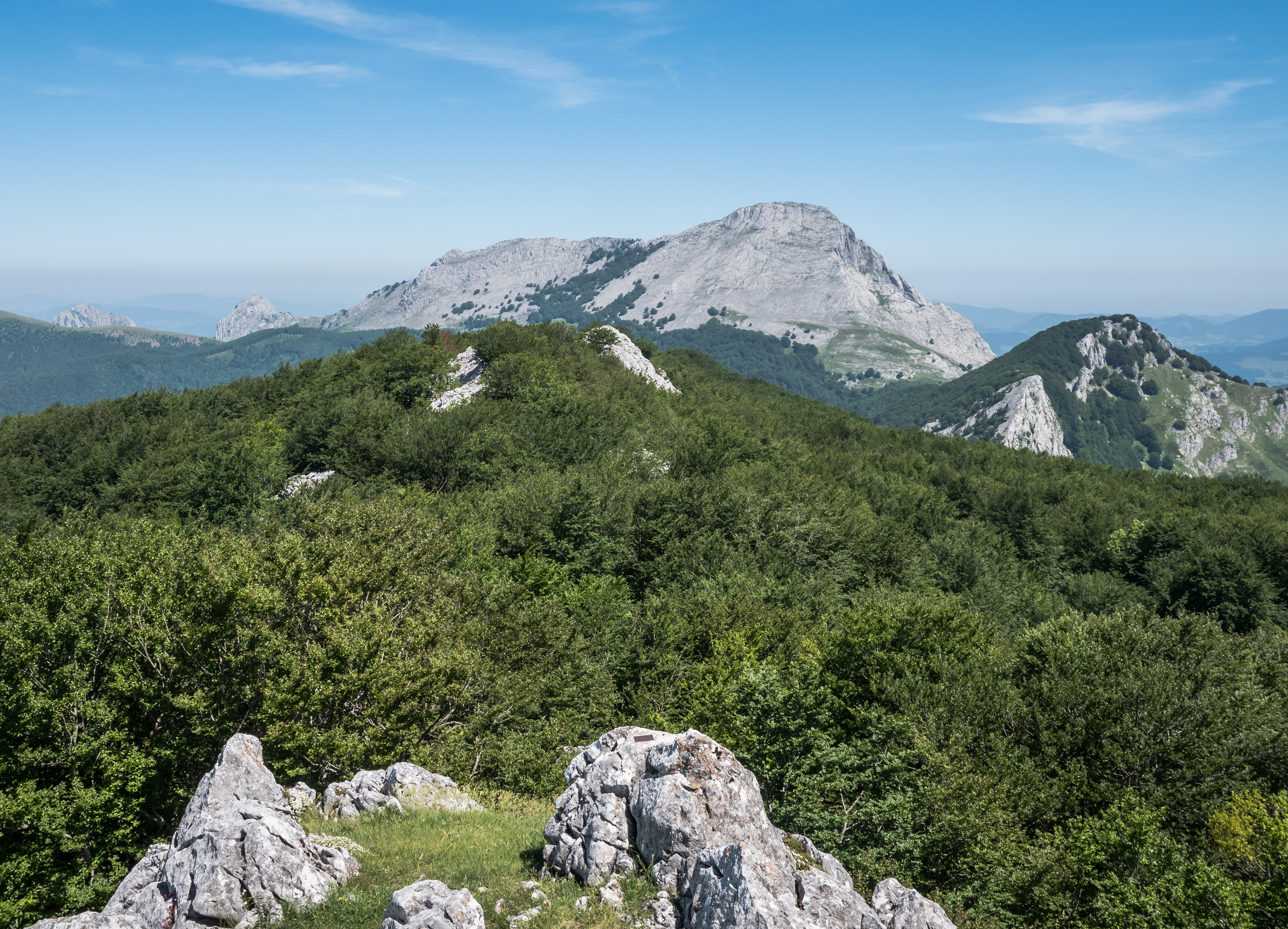
Anboto mountain is one of sites where Mari was believed to dwell

The Christianisation of the Basque Country has been the topic of some discussion. There are, broadly speaking, two views. According to one, Christianity arrived in the Basque Country during the 4th and 5th centuries but according to the other, it did not take place until the 12th and 13th centuries. The Encyclopaedia Britannica says that the Basques were not Christianized until the tenth century, however, and that their earlier animism survives in their folklore. The main issue lies in the different interpretations of what is considered Christianisation. Early traces of Christianity can be found in the major urban areas from the 4th century onwards, a bishopric from 589 in Pamplona and three hermit cave concentrations (two in Álava, one in Navarre) that were in use from the 6th century onwards. In this sense, Christianity arrived "early".

Pre-Christian belief seems to have focused on a goddess called Mari. A number of place-names contain her name, which would suggest these places were related to worship of her such as Anbotoko Mari who appears to have been related to the weather. According to one tradition, she travelled every seven years between a cave on Mount Anboto and one on another mountain (the stories vary); the weather would be wet when she was in Anboto, dry when she was in Aloña, or Supelegor, or Gorbea. One of her names, Mari Urraca possibly ties her to an historical Navarrese princess of the 11th and 12th century, with other legends giving her a brother or cousin who was a Roman Catholic priest. So far the discussions about whether the name Mari is original and just happened to coincide closely with the Christian name María or if Mari is an early Basque attempt to give a Christian veneer to pagan worship have remained speculative. At any rate, Mari (Andramari) is one of the oldest worshipped Christian icons in Basque territories.

Mari's consort is Sugaar. This chthonic couple seems to bear the superior ethical power and the power of creation and destruction. It's said that when they gathered in the high caves of the sacred peaks, they engendered the storms. These meetings typically happened on Friday nights, the day of historical akelarre or coven. Mari was said to reside in Mount Anboto; periodically she crossed the skies as a bright light to reach her other home at Mount Txindoki.

Legends also speak of many and abundant genies, like jentilak (equivalent to giants), lamiak (equivalent to nymphs), mairuak (builders of the cromlechs or stone circles, literally Moors), iratxoak (imps), sorginak (witches, priestesses of Mari), and so on. Basajaun is a Basque version of the Woodwose. There is a trickster named San Martin Txiki ("St Martin the Lesser").

It is unclear whether Neolithic stone structures called dolmens have a religious significance or were strictly functional, built as shelters to house animals or resting shepherds. Some of the dolmens and cromlechs are burial sites serving also as border markers.

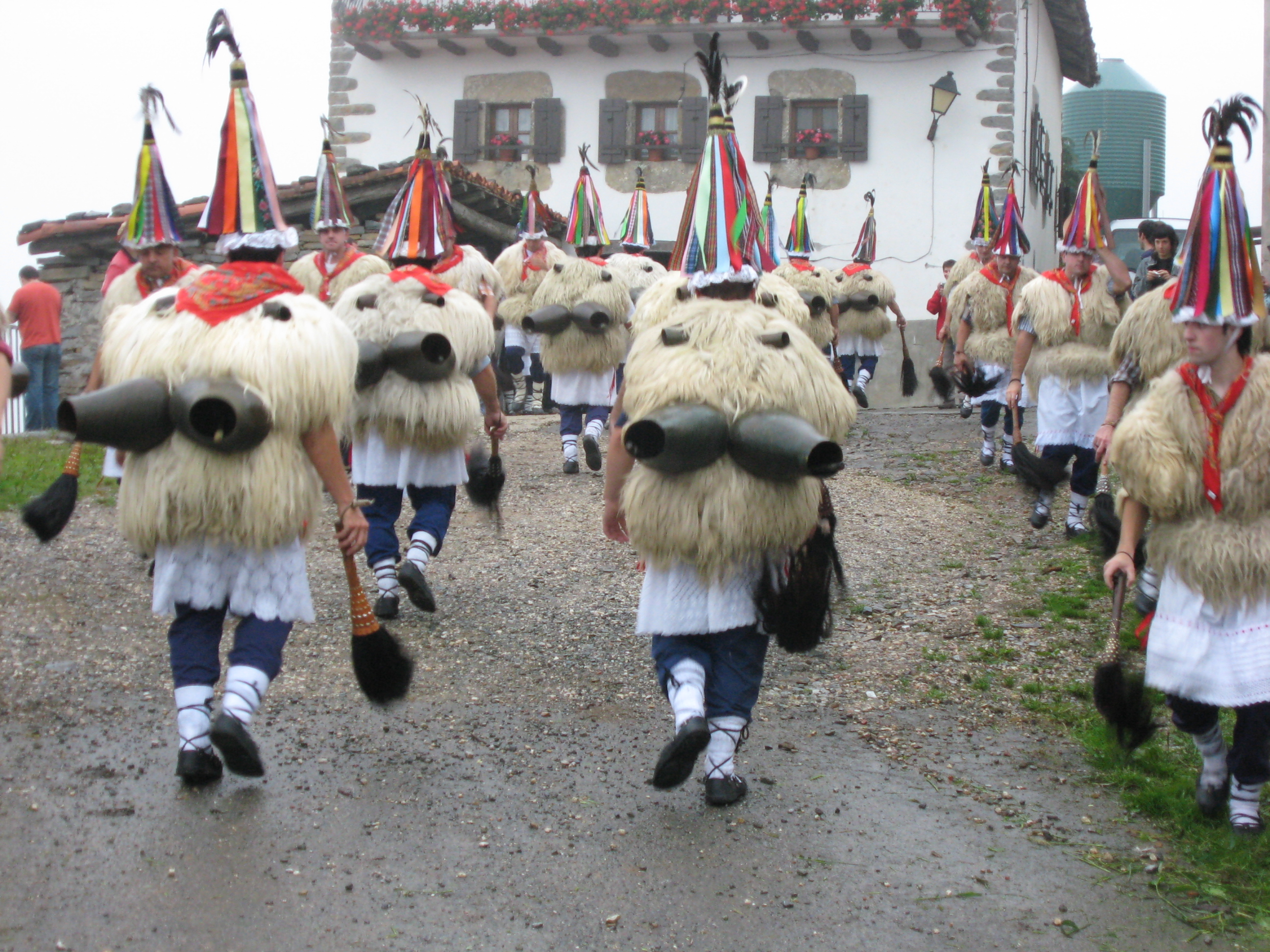
Ioaldunak dancers of Navarre.

The jentilak ('giants'), on the other hand, are a legendary people which explains the disappearance of a people of Stone Age culture that used to live in the highlands and with no knowledge of iron. Many legends about them tell that they were bigger and taller, with a great force, but were displaced by the ferrons, or workers of ironworks foundries, until their total fade-out. They were pagans, but one of them, Olentzero, accepted Christianity and became a sort of Basque Santa Claus. They gave name to several toponyms, as Jentilbaratza.

=== Society ===
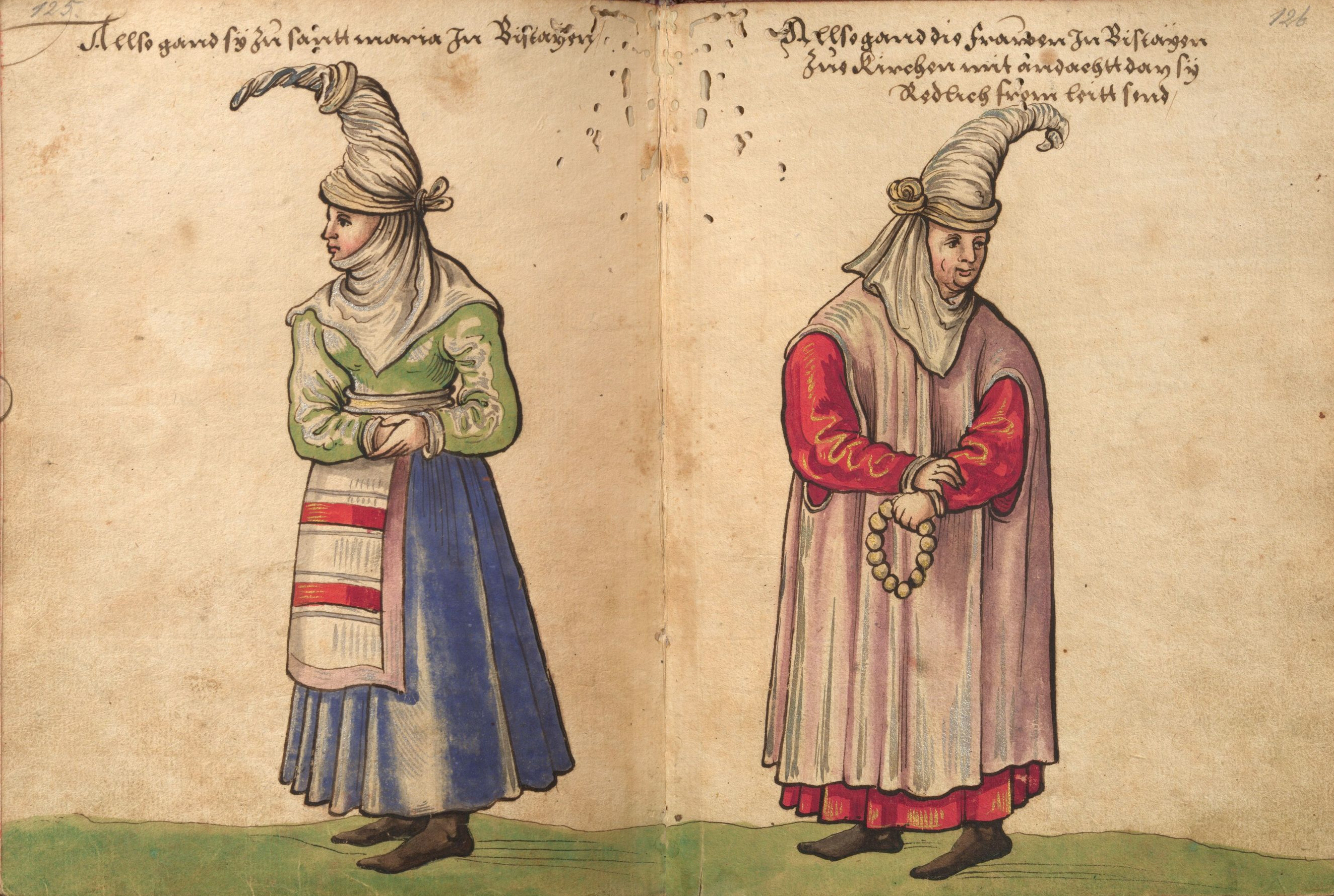
Senior Basque women during the 16th century; the attire was forbidden on Pierre de Lancre's intervention in the Basque Country (1609–1612)

Historically, Basque society can be described as being somewhat at odds with Roman and later European societal norms. Strabo's account of the north of Spain in his Geographica (written between approximately 20 BC and 20 AD) makes a mention of "a sort of woman-rule—not at all a mark of civilization" (Hadington 1992), a first mention of the—for the period—unusual position of women: "Women could inherit and control property as well as officiate in churches." The evidence for this assertion is rather sparse however.

This preference for female dominance existed well into the 20th century:

... matrilineal inheritance laws, and agricultural work performed by women continued in Basque country until the early twentieth century. For more than a century, scholars have widely discussed the high status of Basque women in law codes, as well as their positions as judges, inheritors, and arbitrators through ante-Roman, medieval, and modern times. The system of laws governing succession in the French Basque region reflected total equality between the sexes. Up until the eve of the French Revolution, the Basque woman was truly 'the mistress of the house', hereditary guardian, and head of the lineage.

While women continued to have a higher position in Basque than other western European societies, there is no clear evidence for the assertion that the society was at any point fully 'matriarchal'. The 'Basque matriarchy' argument is typically tied to 20th century nationalism and is at odds with earlier accounts of the society.

Although the Kingdom of Navarre did adopt feudalism, most Basques also possessed unusual social institutions different from those of the rest of feudal Europe. Some aspects of this include the elizate tradition where local house-owners met in front of the church to elect a representative to send to the juntas and Juntas Generales (such as the Juntas Generales de Vizcaya or Guipúzcoa) which administered much larger areas. Another example was that in the medieval period most land was still owned by the farmers themselves, rather than the Church or a king.

== Sports in the Basque Country ==
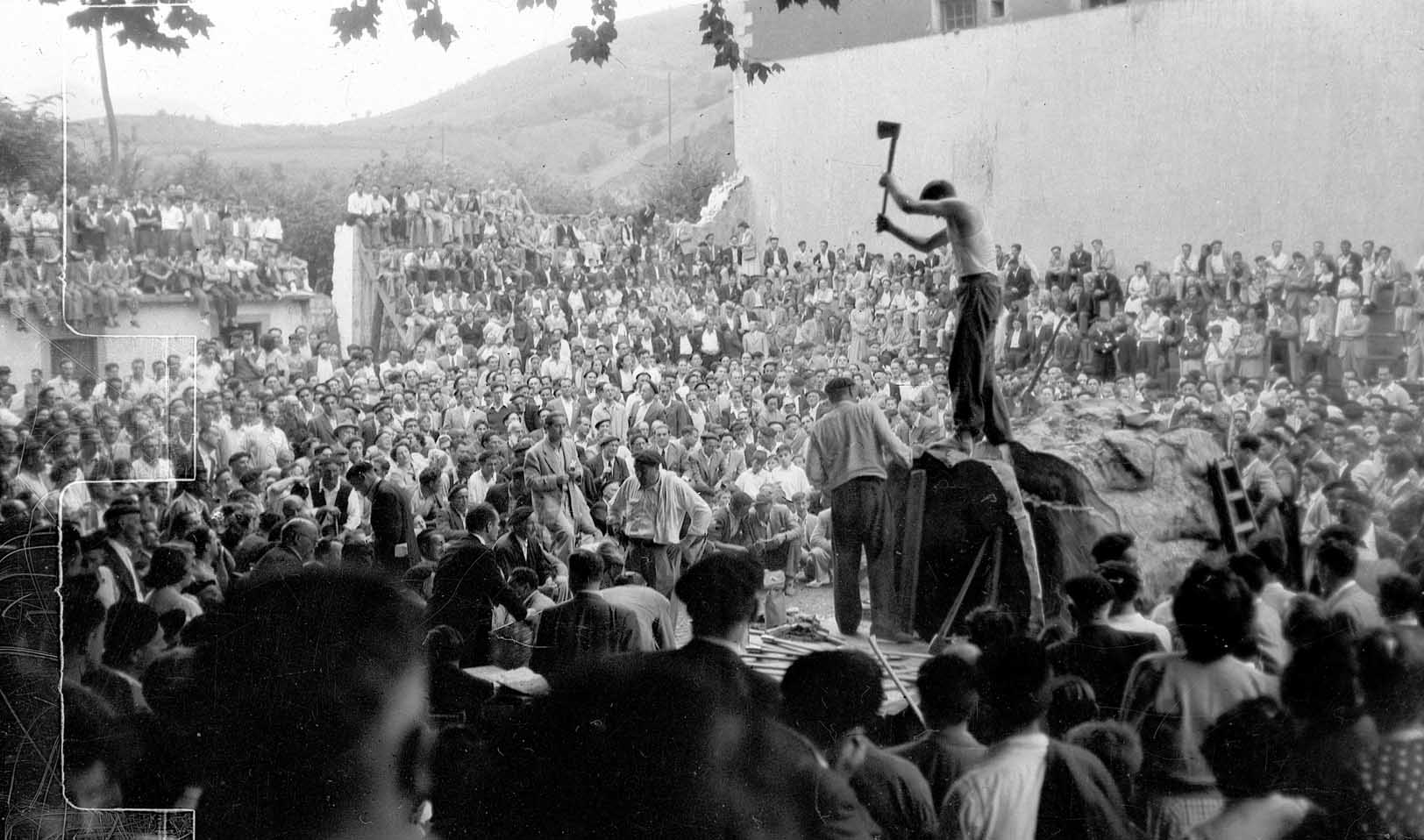
Rivalry and betting in a wood-chopping contest (1949)

=== Pelota ===
The great family of ball games has its unique offspring among Basque ball games, known generically as pilota (Spanish: pelota). Some variants have been exported to the United States and Macau under the name of Jai Alai.

=== Rural sports ===
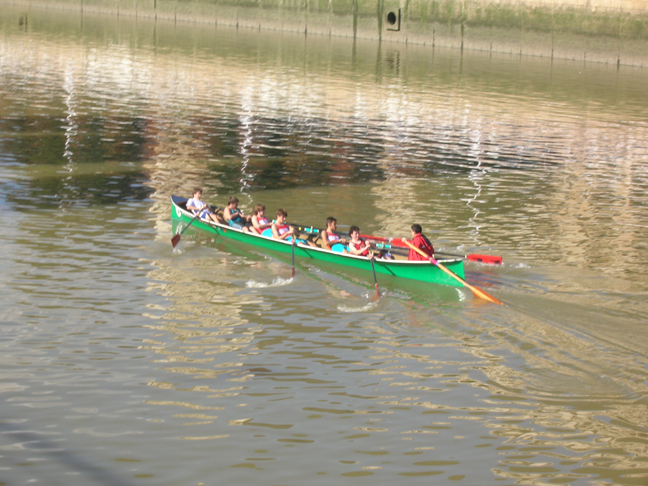
Trainerilla in the Bilbao estuary

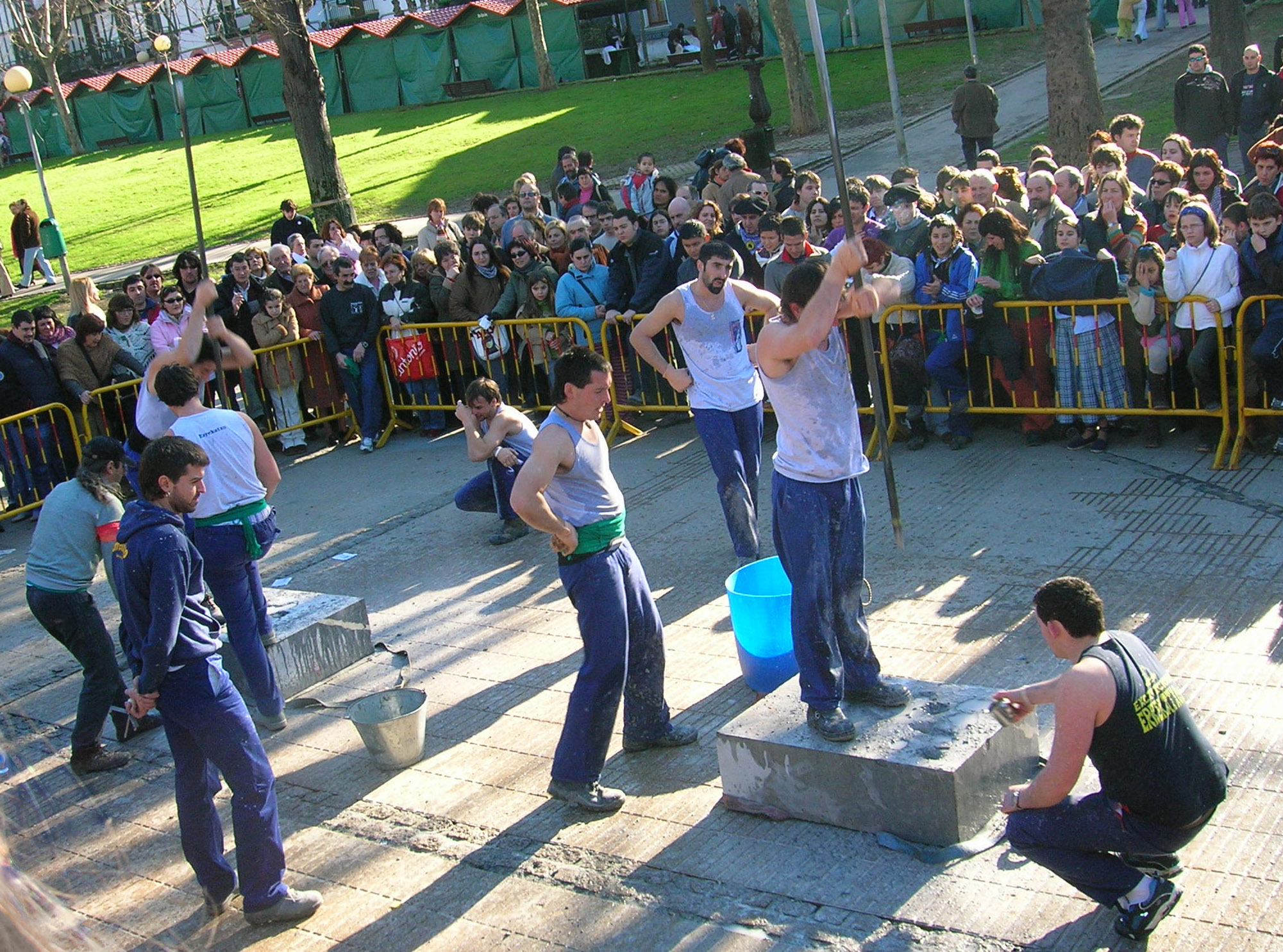
Barrenatzaileak in Barakaldo.

There are several sports derived by Basques from everyday chores. Heavy workers were challenged and bets placed upon them. Examples are:

- estropadak rowing regattas: from fishermen activities.
- sokatira: tug-of-war.
- harri-jasotzea: stone-lifting, from quarry works.
- aizkolaritza and trontzalaritza: wood-chopping and log sawing.
- sega jokoa: cutting grass with a scythe.
- Giza-abere probak: stone block pulling, from construction works:
  - idi probak with teams of oxen.
  - asto probak with donkeys.
  - zaldi probak with horses.
  - gizon probak with human teams.
- txinga eramatea: carrying of weights, one in each hand, representing milk canisters.
- ahari topaketa: ram fights.
- harri zulaketa competitions: drilling stone blocks with a metal bar, only in the former mining areas of West Biscay.
- Basque sheepdog trials competitions.

=== Bull runs and bullock games ===
The encierro (bull run) in Pamplona's fiestas Sanfermines started as a transport of bulls to the ring. These encierros, as well as other bull and bullock related activities are not exclusive to Pamplona but are traditional in many towns and villages of the Basque country.

=== Football ===
There are several clubs within the Basque Country, such as Athletic Bilbao, Real Sociedad, Deportivo Alavés, SD Eibar and, as Navarre club, the CA Osasuna (the only club in La Liga that has a Basque name—osasuna means "health"). In the 2016–17 season these five clubs played together in La Liga, the first instance where five Basque clubs have reached that level at the same time. Athletic's recruitment policy has meant the club refuses to sign any non-Basque players, with "Basque" currently defined to include either ethnic Basques or players of any ethnicity trained by a Basque club. Real Sociedad also previously employed such a policy.

=== Basketball ===
The Basque Country also features several professional basketball teams, the most notable of which is Saski Baskonia from Vitoria-Gasteiz, one of the 11 clubs that own stakes in Euroleague Basketball, the company that operates the continent-wide EuroLeague and EuroCup. They are currently joined in the Spanish top flight, Liga ACB, by Bilbao Basket, with the two clubs involved in a longstanding rivalry. Another club from the Basque Country, Gipuzkoa Basket from San Sebastián, currently plays in the second-level LEB Oro.

=== Rugby union ===
Rugby union is a popular sport among French Basques, with major clubs Biarritz Olympique and Aviron Bayonnais traditional powerhouses in the premier division of French Rugby (the Top 14). Biarritz regularly play Champions Cup matches, especially knockout matches, at Estadio Anoeta in San Sebastián. Games between the Basque clubs and Catalan club USA Perpignan are always hard fought.

=== Professional cycling ===
Cycling is popular and the Euskaltel–Euskadi professional cycling team, partly sponsored by the Basque Government participated in the UCI World Tour division until 2014. Known for their orange tops and hill-climbing ability, their fans were famous for lining the famous Pyrenean climbs in the Tour de France, in support of their compatriots.

Each April, the week-long Tour of the Basque Country route features the region's countryside. Miguel Induráin, born in Villava-Atarrabia, is widely regarded as one of cycling's most successful riders, having won 5 consecutive Tours de France titles.

== Politics ==
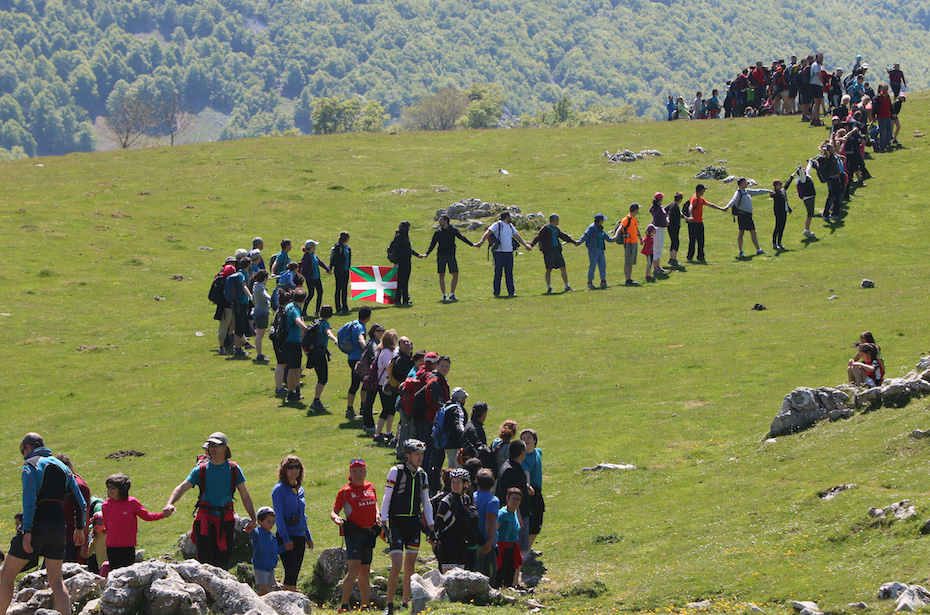
2014 human chain for the Basque Country's right to self-determination

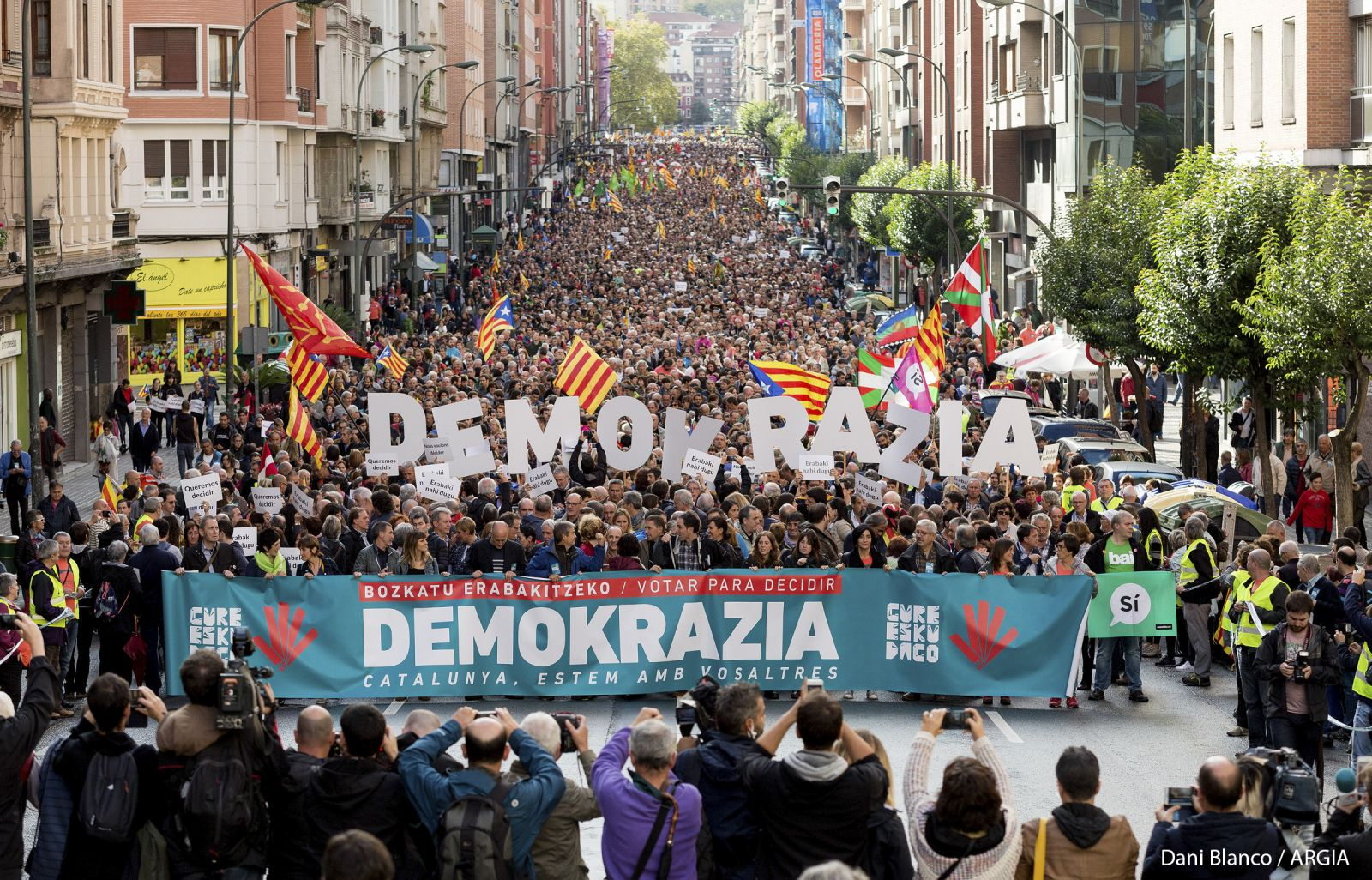
Demonstration in Bilbao in solidarity with Catalan independence referendum, September 2017

While there is no independent Basque state, Spain's autonomous community of the Basque Country, made up of the provinces of Álava (Araba), Biscay (Bizkaia) and Gipuzkoa, is primarily a historical consequence and an answer to the widespread autonomy claim of its population.

Navarre has a separate statute of autonomy, a contentious arrangement designed during Spanish transition to democracy (the Amejoramiento, an 'upgrade' of its previous status during dictatorship). It refers back to the kingdom status of Navarre (up to 1841) and their traditional institutional and legal framework (charters). Basque, the original and main language of Navarre up to the late 18th century, has kept family transmission especially in the northern part of Navarre and central areas to a lesser extent, designated as Basque speaking or mixed area in Navarrese law. Questions of political, linguistic and cultural allegiance and identity are highly complex in Navarre. Politically some Basque nationalists would like to integrate with the Basque Autonomous Community.

The French Basque Country today does not exist as a formal political entity and is officially simply part of the French department of Pyrénées Atlantiques, centered in Béarn. In recent years the number of mayors of the region supporting the creation of a separate Basque department has grown to 63.87%. So far, their attempts have been unsuccessful.

=== Political conflicts ===
==== Language ====
Both the Spanish and French governments have, at times, suppressed Basque linguistic and cultural identity. The French Republics, the epitome of the nation-state, have a long history of attempting the complete cultural absorption of cultural minority groups. Spain has, at most points in its history, granted some degree of linguistic, cultural, and even political autonomy to its Basques, but under the regime of Francisco Franco, the Spanish government reversed the advances of Basque nationalism, as it had fought in the opposite side of the Spanish Civil War: cultural activity in Basque was limited to folkloric issues and the Catholic Church.

Today, the Southern Basque Country within Spain enjoys an extensive cultural and political autonomy. The majority of schools under the jurisdiction of the Basque education system use Basque as the primary medium of teaching. However, the situation is more delicate in the Northern Basque Country within France, where Basque is not officially recognized, and where lack of autonomy and monolingual public schooling in French exert great pressure on the Basque language.

In Navarre, Basque was declared an endangered language, since the conservative government of the Navarrese People's Union restricted its use.

Basque is also spoken by immigrants in the major cities of Spain and France, in Australia, in many parts of Latin America, and in the United States, especially in Nevada, Idaho, and California.

==== Political status and violence ====
Since its articulation by Sabino Arana in the late 19th century, the more radical currents of Basque nationalism have demanded the right of self-determination and even independence. Within the Basque country, this element of Basque politics is often in balance with the conception of the Basque Country as just another part of the Spanish state, a view more commonly espoused on the right of the political spectrum. In contrast, the desire for greater autonomy or independence is particularly common among leftist Basque nationalists. The right of self-determination was asserted by the Basque Parliament in 2002 and 2006. Since self-determination is not recognized in the Spanish Constitution of 1978, a wide majority of Basques abstained (55%) and some even voted against it (23.5%) in the ratification referendum of 6 December that year. However, it was approved by clear majority overall in Spain (87%). The autonomous regime for the Basque Country was approved in a 1979 referendum but the autonomy of Navarre (Amejoramiento del Fuero: "improvement of the charter") was never subject to a referendum but only approved by the Navarrese Cortes (parliament).

== Classification ==
As with their language, the Basques are clearly a distinct cultural group in their region. They regard themselves as culturally and especially linguistically distinct from their surrounding neighbours. Some Basques identify themselves as Basques only whereas others identify themselves both as Basque and Spanish. Many Basques regard the designation as a "cultural minority" as incomplete, favouring instead the definition as a nation, the commonly accepted designation for the Basque people up to the rise of the nation-states and the definition imposed by the 1812 Spanish Constitution.

In modern times, as a European people living in a highly industrialized area, cultural differences from the rest of Europe are inevitably blurred, although a conscious cultural identity as a people or nation remains very strong, as does an identification with their homeland, even among many Basques who have emigrated to other parts of Spain or France, or to other parts of the world.

The strongest distinction between the Basques and their traditional neighbours is linguistic. Surrounded by Romance-language speakers, the Basques traditionally spoke (and many still speak) a language that was not only non-Romance but non-Indo-European. The prevailing belief amongst Basques, and forming part of their national identity, is that their language has continuity with the people who were in this region since not only pre-Roman and pre-Celtic times, but since the Stone Age.

== Notable Basques ==
Among the most notable Basque people are Juan Sebastián Elcano (who led the first successful expedition to circumnavigate the globe after Ferdinand Magellan died mid-journey); Sancho III of Navarre; and Ignatius of Loyola and Francis Xavier, founders of the Society of Jesus.

Don Diego María de Gardoqui y Arriquibar (1735–1798) was also a Basque, who became Spain's first Ambassador to the United States, and Miguel de Unamuno was a noted novelist and philosopher of the late 19th and the 20th century, was also a Basque.

Another well-known Basque was Father Alberto Hurtado, S.J. (1901–1952), a Jesuit priest who founded the charitable housing system Hogar de Cristo, meaning hearth, or home, of Christ, in Chile. El Hogar provided a home-like milieu for the homeless. Hurtado also founded the Chilean Trade Union Association to promote a union movement based on the social teachings of the Catholic Church. He was a friend and savior to all the poor and homeless, and was beatified by Pope John Paul II on 16 October 1994. He was canonized by Pope Benedict XVI on 23 October 2005.

== See also ==
- Aberri Eguna
- Aquitani
- Basque code talkers
- Duchy of Vasconia
- Genetic history of Europe
- Iberians
- Late Basquisation
- List of Basques
- National and regional identity in Spain
- Spanish people
- Vascones
