= Basque Museum and Cultural Center =

The Basque Museum and Cultural Center
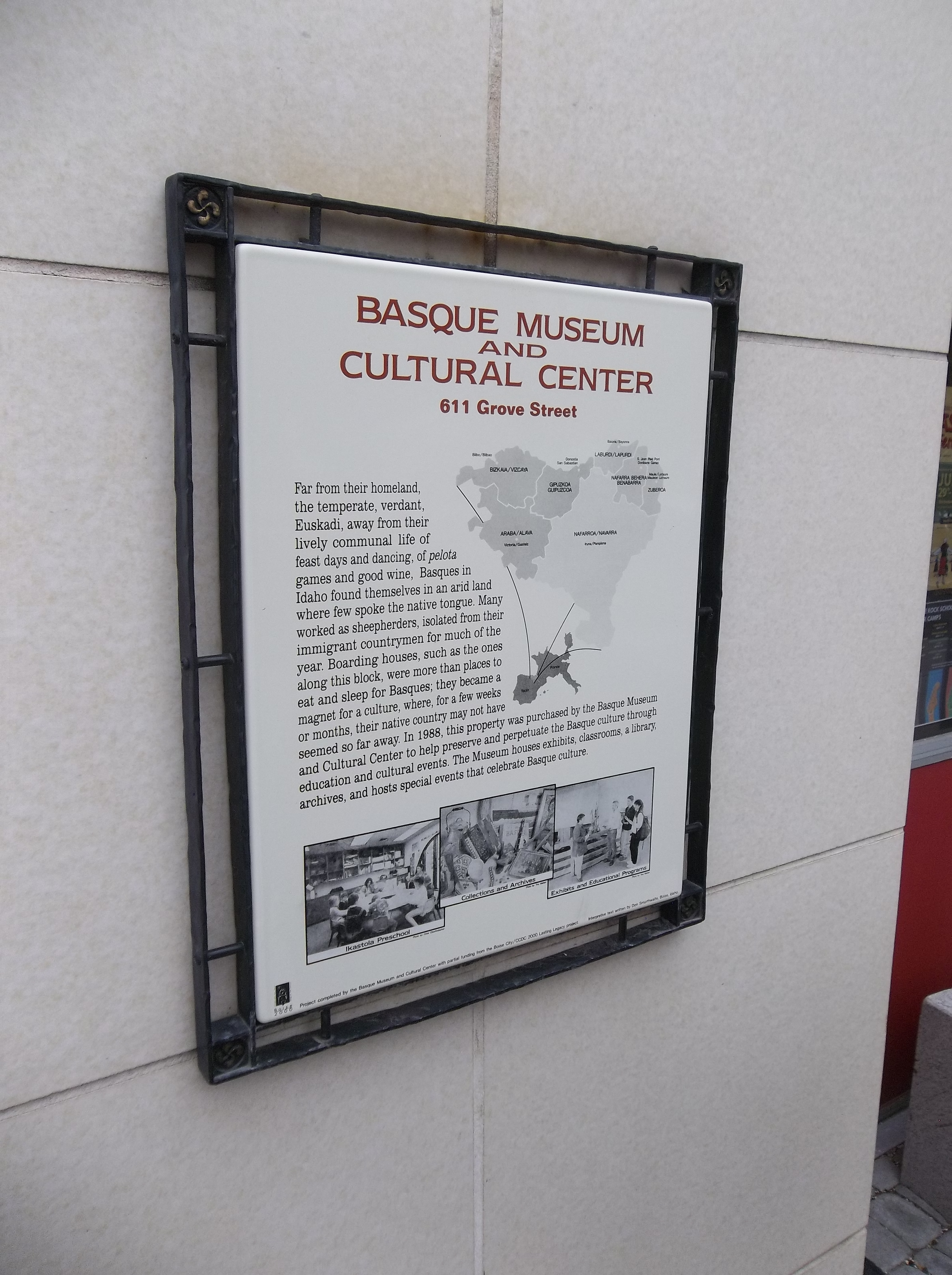
- A sign outside of the Basque Museum and Cultural Center in Boise
- Established: 1985
- Location: 611 West Grove Street; Boise, Idaho
- Website: basquemuseum.eus

The Basque Museum and Cultural Center is an institution in Boise, Idaho focused on Basque culture and history.

It was founded in 1985 and its museum is the only Basque museum in the United States.

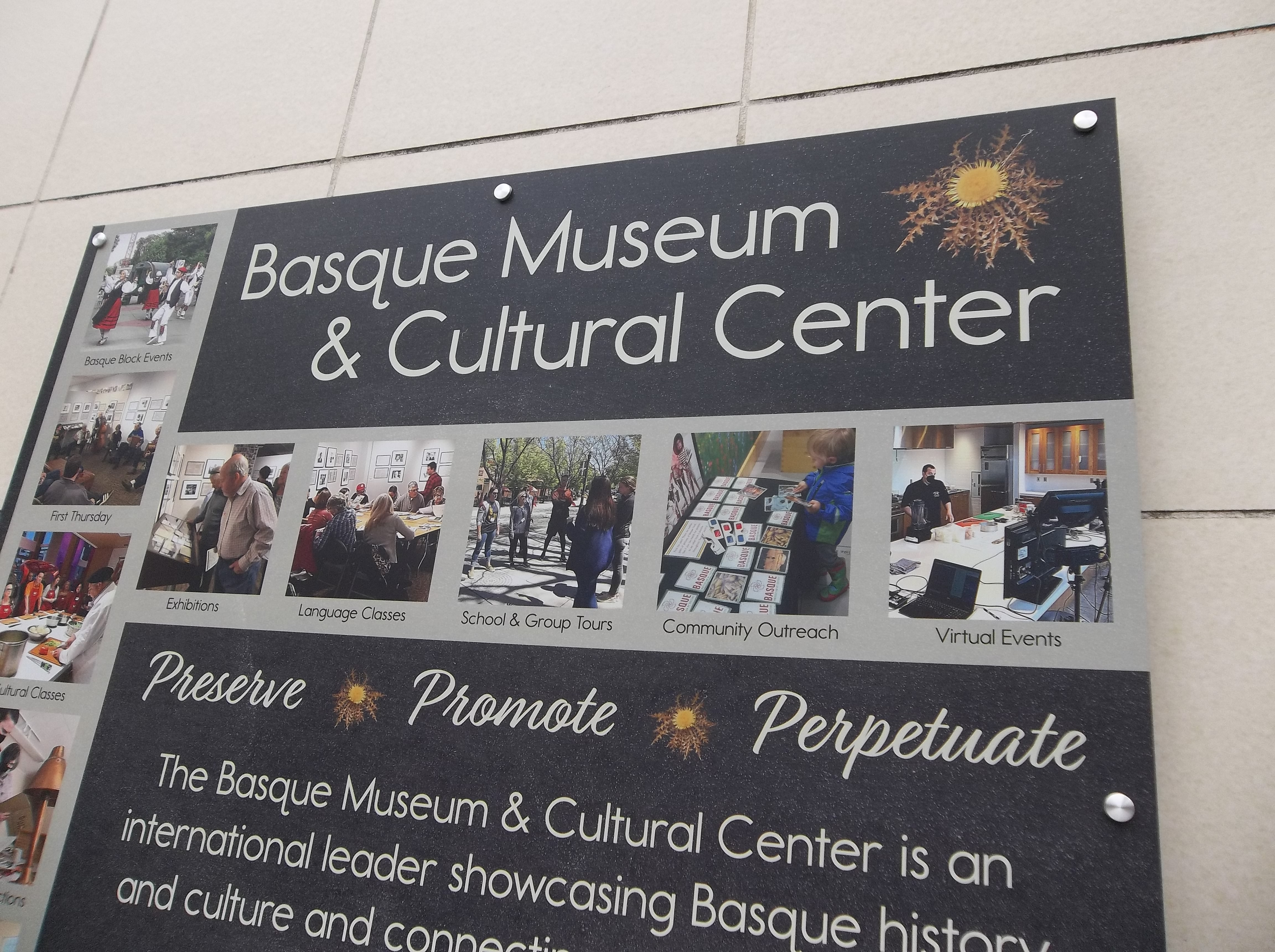
A sign outside the Basque Museum and Cultural Center

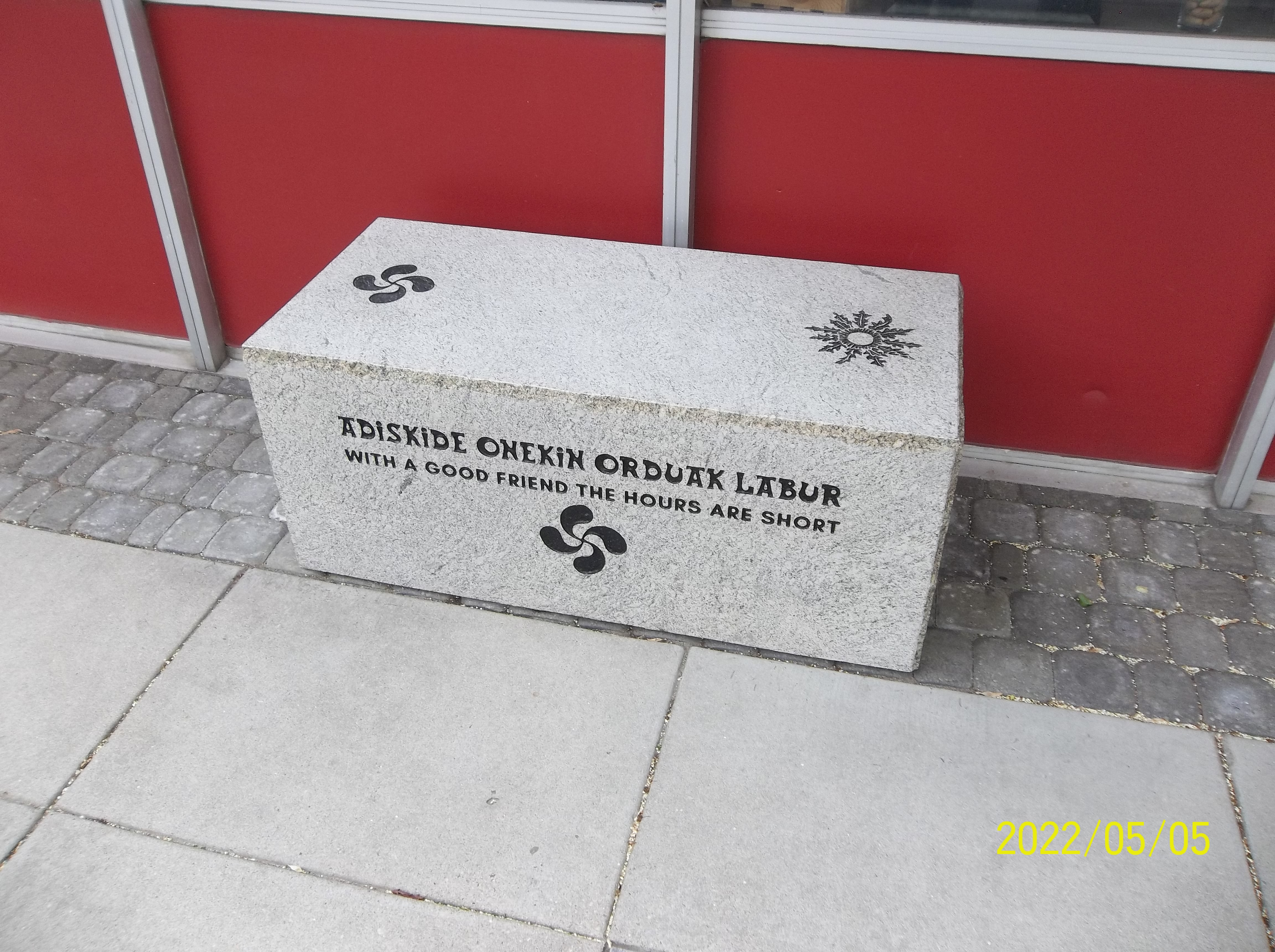
A bench outside the Basque Museum and Cultural Center
