= French Republics =

Five states have borne the name French Republic (République française) since the proclamation of the French Revolution and the abolition of the monarchy in France in 1792:

- French First Republic (1792–1804), lasting until the declaration of the First Empire
- French Second Republic (1848–1852), deposing the July Monarchy and lasting until the Second Empire
- French Third Republic (1870–1940), deposing the Second Empire and lasting until the Fall of France to Nazi Germany
- French Fourth Republic (1946–1958), replacing Vichy France in the aftermath of World War II
- French Fifth Republic (1958–present), since the 1958 French constitutional referendum

== See also ==
- Proposed French Sixth Republic
