= Mancomunidad de la Comarca de Pamplona =

Coordinates: 42°49′N 01°38′E

Mancomunidad de la Comarca de Pamplona Iruñerriko Mankomunitatea
- Mankomunitatea / Mancomunidad; Commonwealth
- Pamplona metropolitan area (in red) in Navarre
- Country: Spain
- Autonomous community: Navarre
- Capital: Pamplona-Iruña
- Municipalities: List: See text

Area
  - Total: 1,278.6 km^{2} (493.7 sq mi)
- Elevation: 449 m (1,473 ft)

Population (2007)
  - Total: 329,531
  - Density: 257.73/km^{2} (667.51/sq mi)

GDP
  - Metro: €18.942 billion (2020)
- Time zone: UTC+1 (CET)
  - Summer (DST): UTC+2 (CEST)

The Mancomunidad de la Comarca de Pamplona, also known as Pamplona metropolitan area, is a community of municipalities of the Pamplona metropolitan area, whose functions are water supply and sewage treatment, waste management, metropolitan public transportation, taxi and the Arga metropolitan park.

Historically, it was born as Mancomunidad de Aguas de la Comarca de Pamplona in 1982 to provide water services. It changed its name when the entity began to manage waste in 1987. Later, it assumed public transportation management (1999) and taxi (2006).

== Municipalities ==
- Adiós
- Antsoain / Ansoáin
- Anue
- Añorbe
- Aranguren
- Atetz / Atez
- Barañain
- Basaburua
- Belaskoain / Belascoáin
- Beriain / Beriáin
- Berriobeiti / Berrioplano
- Berriozar
- Biurrun-Olkotz / Biurrun-Olcoz
- Burlata / Burlada
- Oltza Zendea / Cendea de Olza
- Ziritza / Ciriza
- Zizur Zendea / Cendea de Cizur
- Etxarri / Echarri
- Eguesibar / Egüés
- Eneritz / Enériz
- Esteríbar
- Etxauri
- Ezkabarte / Ezcabarte
- Galar
- Goñi
- Girgillao / Guirguillano
- Huarte / Uharte
- Getze Ibargoiti / Salinas de Ibargoiti
- Imotz
- Itza / Iza
- Txulapain / Juslapeña
- Lantz
- Legarda
- Monreal
- Muruzabal
- Noain (Elortzibar) / Noáin (Valle de Elorz)
- Odieta
- Oláibar
- Ollaran / Valle de Ollo
- Orkoien / Orcoyen
- Pamplona-Iruña
- Tiebas-Muruarte de Reta
- Tirapu
- Ukar / Úcar
- Ultzama
- Uterga
- Vidaurreta
- Atarrabia / Villava
- Zabltza / Zabalza
- Zizur Nagusia / Zizur Mayor

== See also ==
- Cuenca de Pamplona
