= Pamplona City Transport =

Public transportation system operating in the city of Iruña/Pamplona

Transporte Urbano Comarcal de Pamplona / Eskualdeko Hiri Garraioa
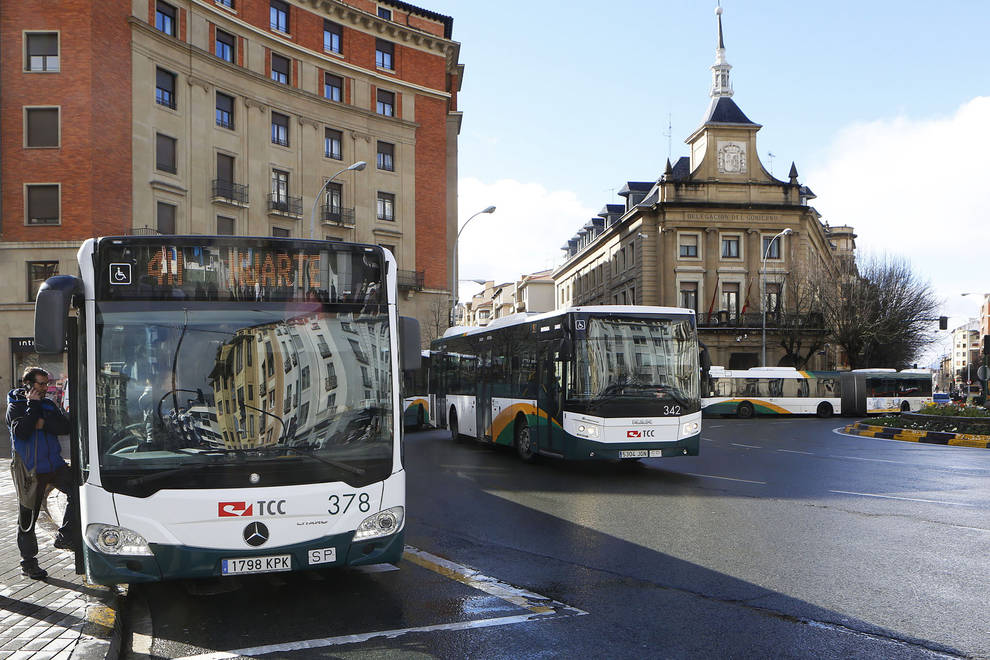
- Buses at Merindadeen plaza hub

Overview
- Owner: Iruñerriko Mankomunitatea
- Locale: Iruñerria
- Transit type: Transit bus Bus rapid transit (2023)
- Number of lines: 34
- Number of stations: 648
- Annual ridership: 40,639,355 (2019)
- Chief executive: David Campión (General Manager); Jesús Velasco (Transport Manager)
- Headquarters: San Frantzisko Kalea, 5 Iruña, Navarre (31001)
- Website: www.infotuc.eus

Operation
- Began operation: 1998
- Operators: TCC (Transports Ciutat Comtal)
- Number of vehicles: 102 (34 electric buses)

Technical
- Average speed: 13 km/h (8 mph)
- Top speed: 50 km/h (30 mph)
System map

Transporte Urbano Comarcal (abbreviated: TUC, meaning: 'Comarcal Urban Transportation System') is a regional public transportation system operating in the city of Iruña/Pamplona.

EHG/TUC is the only transit bus provider for Iruña/Pamplona and surroundings, owned by the Iruñerriko Mankomunitatea/Mancomunidad de la Comarca de Pamplona, and operated by Transports Ciutat Comtal. However, there are coach bus services, owned by the Government of Navarre and operated by different operators, connecting Iruña/Pamplona to the rest of Navarre and to other autonomous communities.

EHG/TUC is, with Bilbobus (Bilbo city), the best transportation system in Spain regarding punctuality, information reliability and vehicle occupation levels. Furthermore, the network has been given a score of 7.8 out of 10 in user satisfaction. It also owns the longest electric transit bus line on the Iberian Peninsula, line 9.

EHG/TUC buses are white, with yellow and green motifs and are commonly called Villavesas or Billabesak, which confuses people from outside of Navarre because they do not know what the local speakers refer to. The name comes from La Villavesa SA, the first transit bus company in Iruñerria/Cuenca de Pamplona, from 1920 to 1969.

== Data ==
=== Ridership ===
This is the yearly ridership data of EHG/TUC buses:

Year	Ridership
1997	28,811,483
1998	28,760,533
1999	31,675,795
2000	33,699,308
2001	34,212,117
2002	33,961,015
2003	34,944,307
2004	33,372,871
2005	35,706,415
2006	37,354,615
2007	38,470,295
2008	38,518,647
2009	36,927,599
2010	36,591,990
2011	36,449,281
2012	34,738,115
2013	33,212,817
2014	32,711,053
2015	34,060,583
2016	35,529,472
2017	36,991,480
2018	39,007,864
2019	40,639,335

=== Fares ===
These are the available fares for EHG/TUC buses in 2019:

==== Transport pass ====
Fare	Price
30 egunak (orokorra); Abono 30 días (general); 30 day pass (general)	€30
30 egunak (gaztea); Abono 30 días (joven); 30 day pass (youth)	€24
30 egunak (familia ugarientzat); Abono 30 días (familias numerosas); 30 day pass (large families)	€21

==== Transport card ====
Fare	Price
Herritar txartela (eguneko zerbitzua); Tarjeta Ciudadana (servicio diurno); Transport Card (day-time)	€0.70
Herritar txartela (gaueko zerbitzua); Tarjeta Ciudadana (servicio nocturno); Transport Card (night-time)	€1.02
Aldatzea (linea desberdinen artean); Transbordo (entre distintas líneas); Transfer (between different lines)	€0.00 (45 min.)

==== Special transport cards ====
Fare	Price
F gizarte (baztertze sozialak); Social F (excluidos sociales); F·card (social excluded)	€0.17
B gizarte (erretirodunak); Social B (jubilados); B·card (retired)	€0.33
C gizarte (familia ugarientzat); Social C (familias numerosas); C·card (large families)	€0.49

==== Casual ====
Fare	Price
Tiket arrunta Billete Sencillo; Cash Fare	€1.35
Tiket arrunta (Sanferminetan); Billete Sencillo (San Fermín); Cash Fare (San Fermin)	€1.60
Aldatzea (linea desberdinen artean); Transbordo (entre distintas líneas); Transfer (between different lines)	€1.35

== Service fleet ==
Eskualdeko Hiri Garraioa
Brand	Model	Units
Man	NL273F	5
Man	NL283F	13
Man	A22	2
Scania	N310UA	6
Scania	N270UB	11
Scania	N280UB	17
Scania	N320UB	3
Solaris	Urbino 12	5
Solaris	Urbino 18	9
Volvo	7900 Hybrid	10
Volvo	D15K240	2
Heuliez	GX437HYB	6
Iveco	Urbanway 18	5
Vectia	Veris 12 Hybrid	3
Vectia	Teris 10 Hybrid	2
Vectia	Veris 12 Electric	6
Mercedes	Citaro Hybrid	4
Mercedes	Citaro G Hybrid	8
Man	Lions City 12C	9
Man	Lions City 18C	7
Man	Lions City 19C	10
Scania	N340UA6X2/2	7
Scania	N340UB4X2/2	6
Man	Lions City 18G	6
Irizar	Ie Tram	-

== Day lines ==
These are the 24 lines in service mainly between 06:00 and 22:00, every day of the week. However, some of them deviate slightly from these times, and others are only active at certain times. They are considered the reference lines of EHG/TUC.

Line	Characteristics										
	Zizur Txikia/Cizur Menor — University of Navarra ↔ Public University of Navarre										
	Start 1999	End -	Length 16.2 km	Stops 16/17	Time 24/22 min.	Average speed 16.1 km/h	Frequency 20-60 min.	Buses 1-3	Service days M / T / W / T / F / S / S	Operator TCC (Transports Ciutat Comtal)	Services
Service details: Serviced zones: Iruña/Pamplona and Zizur Txikia/Cizur Menor; Note: On weekends, the line only serves the stops between Zizur Txikia/Cizur Menor and Askatasun Plaza/Plaza de la Libertad
Frequency: Weekdays: 20 minutes (from 07:00 to 22:20); Saturdays: 30 minutes (from 07:30 to 14:00) - 60 minutes (from 14:00 to 22:00); Sundays and bank holidays: 60 minutes (from 07:00 to 22:00); Frequencies apply to all stops between University of Navarra and Public University of Navarre. One out of three buses serves Zizur Txikia/Cizur Menor on weekdays.
	Nafarroako Gorteen/Cortes de Navarra ↔ Etxabakoitz/Echavacoiz										
	Start 1999	End -	Length 13.3 km	Stops 16/17	Time 25/21 min.	Average speed 7.82 km/h	Frequency 10-20 min.	Buses 3-6	Service days M / T / W / T / F / S / S	Operator TCC (Transports Ciutat Comtal)	Services
Service details: Serviced zones: Iruña/Pamplona
Frequency: Weekdays: 10 minutes (from 07:25 to 20:10) - 15 minutes (from 06:55 to 07:25 and from 20:10 to 22:15); Saturdays: 12 minutes (from 09:30 to 22:19) - 15 minutes (from 06:50 to 09:30); Sundays and bank holidays: 15 minutes (from 07:00 to 17:00) - 20 minutes (from 17:00 to 22:15); Frequencies apply to all stops.
	Circular West: Hirigunea/Casco Antiguo ↔ Antsoain/Ansoáin										
	Start 1999	End -	Length 8.4 km	Stops 23	Time 30 min.	Average speed 16.8 km/h	Frequency 10-15 min.	Buses 4-6	Service days M / T / W / T / F / S / S	Operator TCC (Transports Ciutat Comtal)	Services
Service details: Serviced zones: Iruña/Pamplona and Antsoain/Ansoáin; Note: Circular line, anticlockwise. Line complements it clockwise
Frequency: Weekdays: 10 minutes (from 07:05 to 22:25) - 12 minutes (from 06:29 to 07:05); Saturdays: 10 minutes (from 09:05 to 22:25) - 12 minutes (from 06:30 to 09:05); Sundays and bank holidays: 12 minutes (from 09:21 to 22:33) - 15 minutes (from 06:23 to 09:21); Frequencies apply to all stops.
	Barañain ↔ Atarrabia/Villava — Uharte/Huarte — Arre — Orikain										
	Start 1999	End -	Length 33.8 km	Stops 34/39	Time 53/66 min.	Average speed 13.3 km/h	Frequency 6-15 min.	Buses 8-15	Service days M / T / W / T / F / S / S	Operator TCC (Transports Ciutat Comtal)	Services
Service details: Serviced zones: Iruña/Pamplona, Barañain, Burlata/Burlada, Atarrabia/Villava, Uharte/Huarte, Arre and Orikain; Note: After Atarrabia/Villava, the line has three branches: Uharte/Huarte, Arre and Orikain
Frequency: Weekdays: 6 minutes (from 06:38 to 21:47) - 8 minutes (from 06:27 to 06:38 and from 21:48 to 22:27); Saturdays: 8 minutes (from 07:10 to 21:34) - 10 minutes (from 06:26 to 07:10 and from 21:34 to 22:30); Sundays and bank holidays: 12 minutes (from 07:54 to 22:33) - 15 minutes (from 06:30 to 07:54); Schedule: Weekdays: 6:36 6:58 7:58 8:34 11:58 13:34 14:10 14:34 17:46 18:46 20:34 21:38 22:26 / 7:51 11:03 13:27 15:27 16:15 19:51; Saturdays: 6:50 7:28 8:16 9:36 12:16 13:36 14:24 14:56 16:48 17:52 18:56 20:48 21:36 22:50 / 9:01 11:09 15:41 19:57; Sundays and bank holidays: 7:39 12:48 14:00 21:36 / 9:06 10:18 16:18 19:30; Frequencies apply to all stops between Barañain and Atarrabia/Villava. One out of two buses serves Uharte/Huarte. The schedule shows passing times at Arre/Orikain.
	Orvina 3 ↔ University of Navarra										
	Start 1999	End -	Length 11.1 km	Stops 17/16	Time 25/25 min.	Average speed 13.8 km/h	Frequency 15-20 min.	Buses 3-4	Service days M / T / W / T / F / S / S	Operator TCC (Transports Ciutat Comtal)	Services
Service details: Serviced zones: Iruña/Pamplona
Frequency: Weekdays: 15 minutes (from 06:30 to 22:15); Saturdays: 20 minutes (from 06:30 to 22:10); Sundays and bank holidays: 20 minutes (from 06:30 to 22:10); Frequencies apply to all stops.
	Arrotxapea/Rochapea ↔ Public University of Navarre										
	Start 1999	End -	Length 11.6 km	Stops 17/15	Time 25/25 min.	Average speed 13.9 km/h	Frequency 15-20 min.	Buses 3-4	Service days M / T / W / T / F / S / S	Operator TCC (Transports Ciutat Comtal)	Services
Service details: Serviced zones: Iruña/Pamplona
Frequency: Weekdays: 15 minutes (from 06:45 to 22:15); Saturdays: 15 minutes (from 09:00 to 22:15) - 20 minutes (from 06:40 to 09:00); Sundays and bank holidays: 20 minutes (from 06:40 to 22:20); Frequencies apply to all stops.
	Atarrabia/Villava ↔ Barañain										
	Start 1999	End -	Length 21.5 km	Stops 35/34	Time 52/49 min.	Average speed 12.9 km/h	Frequency 10-20 min.	Buses 6-12	Service days M / T / W / T / F / S / S	Operator TCC (Transports Ciutat Comtal)	Services
Service details: Serviced zones: Iruña/Pamplona, Barañain, Antsoain/Ansoáin, Burlata/Burlada and Atarrabia/Villava
Frequency: Weekdays: 10 minutes (from 06:25 to 20:00) - 12 minutes (from 20:00 to 22:35); Saturdays: 15 minutes (from 06:30 to 22:35); Sundays and bank holidays: 15 minutes (from 08:20 to 22:35) - 20 minutes (from 06:30 to 08:20); Frequencies apply to all stops.
	Nafarroako Blanka/Blanca de Navarra ↔ Buztintxuri										
	Start 1999	End -	Length 10.1 km	Stops 12/10	Time 26/22 min.	Average speed 12.6 km/h	Frequency 12-20 min.	Buses 3-4	Service days M / T / W / T / F / S / S	Operator TCC (Transports Ciutat Comtal)	Services
Service details: Serviced zones: Iruña/Pamplona
Frequency: Weekdays: 12 minutes (from 07:21 to 21:21) - 15 minutes (from 06:38 to 07:21 and from 21:21 to 22:29); Saturdays: 12 minutes (from 06:40 to 22:30); Sundays and bank holidays: 20 minutes (from 07:00 to 22:22); Frequencies apply to all stops.
	Renfe ↔ Public University of Navarre										
	Start 1999	End -	Length 13.2 km	Stops 16/16	Time 30/30 min.	Average speed 13.2 km/h	Frequency 12-20 min.	Buses 2-5	Service days M / T / W / T / F / S / S	Operator TCC (Transports Ciutat Comtal)	Services
Service details: Serviced zones: Iruña/Pamplona; Note: On Sundays and bank holidays, the line serves only the stops between Renfe and Bianako Printzearen Plaza/Plaza Príncipe de Viana
Frequency: Weekdays: 12 minutes (from 06:36 to 22:48); Saturdays: 15 minutes (from 06:30 to 22:30); Sundays and bank holidays: 20 minutes (from 06:46 to 22:26); Frequencies apply to all stops.
	Belosogoiti/Beloso ↔ Orkoien										
	Start 1999	End -	Length 18.4 km	Stops 21/20	Time 35/36 min.	Average speed 15.7 km/h	Frequency 30-35 min.	Buses 2-3	Service days M / T / W / T / F / S / S	Operator TCC (Transports Ciutat Comtal)	Services
Service details: Serviced zones: Iruña/Pamplona and Orkoien
Frequency: Weekdays: 30 minutes (from 06:30 to 22:35); Saturdays: 35 minutes (from 06:45 to 21:55); Sundays and bank holidays: 35 minutes (from 06:45 to 21:55); Frequencies apply to all stops.
	Ezkaba ↔ Galaria — Mutiloa/Mutilva Industrialdea										
	Start 1999	End -	Length 20.6 km	Stops 21/20	Time 33/33 min.	Average speed 18.4 km/h	Frequency 15-20 min.	Buses 3-4	Service days M / T / W / T / F / S / S	Operator TCC (Transports Ciutat Comtal)	Services
Service details: Serviced zones: Iruña/Pamplona, Antsoain/Ansoáin, Kordobila/Cordovilla and Mutiloa/Mutilva; Note: After Sadar, the line has two branches: Galaria and Mutiloa/Mutilva Industrialdea (not served on Saturday afternoons, Sundays and bank holidays)
Frequency: Weekdays: 15 minutes (from 06:35 to 22:38); Saturdays: 20 minutes (from 06:33 to 22:33); Sundays and bank holidays: 20 minutes (from 06:33 to 22:33); Frequencies apply to all stops between Ezkaba and Sadar. One out of two buses serves Galaria and Mutiloa/Mutilva on weekdays and Saturday mornings.
	Ermitagaña ↔ Mendillorri										
	Start 1999	End -	Length 13.9 km	Stops 19/17	Time 26/32 min.	Average speed 13.7 km/h	Frequency 10-20 min.	Buses 4-7	Service days M / T / W / T / F / S / S	Operator TCC (Transports Ciutat Comtal)	Services
Service details: Serviced zones: Iruña/Pamplona
Frequency: Weekdays: 10 minutes (from 06:30 to 20:54) - 12 minutes (from 20:54 to 22:30); Saturdays: 15 minutes (from 06:36 to 22:22); Sundays and bank holidays: 20 minutes (from 06:42 to 22:30); Frequencies apply to all stops.
	Udaletxea/Ayuntamiento ↔ Arrotxapea/Rochapea — Artika/Artica										
	Start 1999	End -	Length 7.8 km	Stops 9/9	Time 15/15 min.	Average speed 15.6 km/h	Frequency 30-60 min.	Buses 1	Service days M / T / W / T / F / S / S	Operator TCC (Transports Ciutat Comtal)	Services
Service details: Serviced zones: Iruña/Pamplona and Artika/Artica; Note: All of the buses reach Arrotxapea/Rochapea, but only some of them go up to Artika/Artica
Frequency: Weekdays: 30 minutes (from 06:40 to 22:20); Saturdays: 30 minutes (from 06:40 to 22:20); Sundays and bank holidays: 30 minutes (from 06:40 to 22:20); Frequencies apply to all stops between Udaletxea and Arrotxapea. One out of two buses serves Artika
	Pablo Sarasate ↔ Ardoi — Zizur Nagusia/Zizur Mayor										
	Start 1999	End -	Length 16.2 km	Stops 16/17	Time 25/25 min.	Average speed 19.4 km/h	Frequency 20-60 min.	Buses 2-6	Service days M / T / W / T / F / S / S	Operator TCC (Transports Ciutat Comtal)	Services
Service details: Serviced zones: Iruña/Pamplona and Zizur Nagusia/Zizur Mayor; Note: All of the buses reach Ardoi, but only some of them go up to Zizur Nagusia/Zizur Mayor
Frequency: Weekdays: 20 minutes (from 06:30 to 22:30); Saturdays: 30 minutes (from 06:30 to 22:30); Sundays and bank holidays: 30 minutes (from 06:30 to 22:30); Frequencies apply to all stops between Pablo Sarasate and Ardoi. One out of three buses serves Zizur Nagusia/Zizur Mayor on weekdays and one out of two on weekends.
	Berriogoiti/Berrioplano — Berriozar ↔ Noain — Beriain										
	Start 1999	End -	Length 36.4 km	Stops 36/35	Time 57/62 min.	Average speed 18.2 km/h	Frequency 12-20 min.	Buses 6-10	Service days M / T / W / T / F / S / S	Operator TCC (Transports Ciutat Comtal)	Services
Service details: Serviced zones: Iruña/Pamplona, Berriogoiti/Berriosuso, Berriobeiti/Berrioplano, Aitzoain/Aizoáin, Berriozar, Kordobila/Cordovilla, Noain and Beriain; Note: All of the buses reach Berriozar, but only some of them go up to Berriogoiti/Berriosuso. The same applies to Noain and Beriain
Frequency: Weekdays: 12 minutes (from 06:57 to 20:49) - 15 minutes (from 06:26 to 06:57 and from 20:49 to 22:27); Saturdays: 15 minutes (from 06:30 to 22:350); Sundays and bank holidays: 20 minutes (from 06:40 to 22:26); Frequencies apply to all stops between Berriozar and Noain. Once an hour, a bus goes up to Berriogoiti/Berriosuso and every 30 minutes to Beriain on weekdays and at :00 and :45 on weekends.
	Mutiloa/Mutilva ↔ Berriozar										
	Start 1999	End -	Length 15.4 km	Stops 20/20	Time 40/40 min.	Average speed 8.8 km/h	Frequency 15-40 min.	Buses 3-6	Service days M / T / W / T / F / S / S	Operator TCC (Transports Ciutat Comtal)	Services
Service details: Serviced zones: Iruña/Pamplona, Berriozar, Artika/Artica and Mutiloa/Mutilva
Frequency: Weekdays: 15 minutes (from 06:30 to 22:30); Saturdays: 20 minutes (from 06:30 to 22:30); Sundays and bank holidays: 40 minutes (from 07:10 to 22:35); Frequencies apply to all stops.
	Zizur Nagusia/Zizur Mayor ↔ Sarriguren										
	Start 1999	End -	Length 24.2 km	Stops 24/28	Time 40/40 min.	Average speed 18.5 km/h	Frequency 12-20 min.	Buses 6-8	Service days M / T / W / T / F / S / S	Operator TCC (Transports Ciutat Comtal)	Services
Service details: Serviced zones: Iruña/Pamplona, Zizur Nagusia/Zizur Mayor, Burlata/Burlada and Sarriguren
Frequency: Weekdays: 12 minutes (from 07:00 to 20:40) - 15 minutes (from 06:29 to 07:00 and from 20:40 to 22:30); Saturdays: 15 minutes (from 06:30 to 22:31); Sundays and bank holidays: 20 minutes (from 06:30 to 22:30); Frequencies apply to all stops.
	Erripagaña/Ripagaina ↔ Barañain										
	Start 1999	End -	Length 18.0 km	Stops 29/29	Time 40/35 min.	Average speed 14.4 km/h	Frequency 15-20 min.	Buses 3-6	Service days M / T / W / T / F / S / S	Operator TCC (Transports Ciutat Comtal)	Services
Service details: Serviced zones: Iruña/Pamplona, Barañain and Burlata/Burlada
Frequency: Weekdays: 15 minutes (from 06:20 to 22:15); Saturdays: 15 minutes (from 06:32 to 22:15); Sundays and bank holidays: 20 minutes (from 06:25 to 22:20); Frequencies apply to all stops.
	Bianako Printzea/Príncipe de Viana ↔ Gorraitz/Gorráiz										
	Start 1999	End -	Length 19.2 km	Stops 22/22	Time 22/27 min.	Average speed 23.0 km/h	Frequency 20-90 min.	Buses 2-3	Service days M / T / W / T / F / S / S	Operator TCC (Transports Ciutat Comtal)	Services
Service details: Serviced zones: Iruña/Pamplona, Burlata/Burlada, Sarriguren, Olatz, Gorraitz/Gorráiz and Uharte/Huarte; Note: After Olatz, the line has three branches: Ipar Gorraiz/Gorraiz Norte, Hegoa Gorraiz/Gorraiz Sur and Itaroa Urbanizazioa/Urbanización Itaroa
Frequency: Weekdays: 20 minutes (from 06:33 to 22:33); Saturdays: 30 minutes (from 06:45 to 22:20); Sundays and bank holidays: 30 minutes (from 06:45 to 22:20); Frequencies apply to all stops between Bianako Printzea/Príncipe de Viana and Olatz. One out of three buses services each branch on weekdays, and one out of two on weekends. Ipar/Norte and Hegoa/Sur branches merge on weekends.
	Circular East: Hirigunea/Casco Antiguo ↔ Antsoain/Ansoáin										
	Start 2013	End -	Length 8.4 km	Stops 23	Time 30 min.	Average speed 16.8 km/h	Frequency 10-15 min.	Buses 4-6	Service days M / T / W / T / F / S / S	Operator TCC (Transports Ciutat Comtal)	Services
Service details: Serviced zones: Iruña/Pamplona and Antsoain/Ansoáin; Note: Circular line, clockwise. Line complements it anticlockwise
Frequency: Weekdays: 10 minutes (from 07:05 to 22:25) - 12 minutes (from 06:29 to 07:05); Saturdays: 10 minutes (from 09:05 to 22:25) - 12 minutes (from 06:30 to 09:05); Sundays and bank holidays: 12 minutes (from 09:21 to 22:33) - 15 minutes (from 06:23 to 09:21); Frequencies apply to all stops.
	Merindadeen/Merindades ↔ Mutiloa/Mutilva										
	Start 2017	End -	Length 7.4 km	Stops 7/8	Time 15/15 min.	Average speed 11.7 km/h	Frequency 30 min.	Buses 1	Service days M / T / W / T / F / S / S	Operator TCC (Transports Ciutat Comtal)	Services
Service details: Serviced zones: Iruña/Pamplona and Mutiloa/Mutilva
Frequency: Weekdays: 30 minutes (from 06:30 to 22:30); Saturdays: 30 minutes (from 06:30 to 22:30); Sundays and bank holidays: 30 minutes (from 06:30 to 22:30); Frequencies apply to all stops.
	Kordobila/Cordovilla — Bianako Printzea/Príncipe de Viana ↔ Itaroa — Olloki/Olloqui										
	Start 1999	End -	Length 25.8 km	Stops 20/22	Time 45/52 min.	Average speed 16.0 km/h	Frequency 30-90 min.	Buses 1-2	Service days M / T / W / T / F / S / S	Operator TCC (Transports Ciutat Comtal)	Services
Service details: Serviced zones: Iruña/Pamplona, Kordobila/Cordovilla, Burlata/Burlada, Sarriguren, Olatz, Gorraitz/Gorráiz, Uharte/Huarte and Olloki/Olloqui; Note: On weekdays, the line services all the stops between Kordobila/Cordovilla and Olloki/Olloqui
Frequency: Weekdays: 60 minutes (from 06:25 to 22:25); Saturdays: 30 minutes + 60 minutes (from 07:00 to 22:00); Sundays and bank holidays: 30 minutes + 60 minutes (from 07:00 to 22:00); Frequencies apply to all stops on weekdays and between Bianako Printzea/Príncipe de Viana and Itaroa on weekends (there is a bus every 60 minutes, then in 30 minutes, then again in 60 minutes....). The other stop's frequency is 90 minutes.
	Market Circular: Donibane/San Juan ↔ Landaben										
	Start 1999	End -	Length 5.8 km	Stops 11	Time 22 min.	Average speed 15.8 km/h	Frequency 25 min.	Buses 1	Service days S (September → June)	Operator TCC (Transports Ciutat Comtal)	Services
Service details: Serviced zones: Iruña/Pamplona and Barañain; Note: Circular line, clockwise. There is not an anticlockwise line complementing it.
Frequency: Sundays: 25 minutes (from 09:00 to 14:25); Frequencies apply to all stops.
	Bianako Printzea/Príncipe de Viana ↔ Mutiloa/Mutilva										
	Start 1999	End -	Length 10.9 km	Stops 17/17	Time 15/15 min.	Average speed 21.2 km/h	Frequency 30-60 min.	Buses 1	Service days M / T / W / T / F / S / S	Operator TCC (Transports Ciutat Comtal)	Services
Service details: Serviced zones: Iruña/Pamplona and Mutiloa/Mutilva
Frequency: Weekdays: 30 minutes (from 06:35 to 22:20); Saturdays: 30 minutes (from 06:35 to 22:20); Sundays and bank holidays: 60 minutes (from 06:40 to 22:05); Frequencies apply to all stops.

== Night lines ==
These are the ten lines ensuring service mainly between 22:00 and, depending on the day, 23:00, 02:00 or 04:00.

Line	Characteristics										
	San Inazio ↔ Zizur Nagusia										
	Start 2005	End -	Length 17.9 km	Stops 24/24	Time 30/30 min.	Average speed 17.9 km/h	Frequency 60 min.	Buses 1	Service days M / T / W / T / F / S / S	Operator TCC (Transports Ciutat Comtal)	Services
Service details: Serviced zones: Iruña/Pamplona and Zizur Nagusia
Schedule: Nights from Sunday to Thursday and bank holidays: 23:00 00:00; Friday nights: 23:00 00:00 01:00 02:00 03:00 04:00; Saturday nights and pre-bank holiday nights: 23:00 00:00 01:00 02:00 03:00 04:00 05:00 06:00; Schedules show exits from San Inazio
	Pablo Sarasate ↔ Barañain										
	Start 2005	End -	Length 12.9 km	Stops 21/18	Time 30/30 min.	Average speed 10.8 km/h	Frequency 20-30 min.	Buses 2	Service days M / T / W / T / F / S / S	Operator TCC (Transports Ciutat Comtal)	Services
Service details: Serviced zones: Iruña/Pamplona and Barañain
Schedule: Nights from Sunday to Thursday and bank holidays: 22:45 23:15 23:45; Friday nights: 22:45 23:15 23:45 00:15 00:45 01:15 01:45 02:15 02:45 03:15 03:45; Saturday nights and pre-bank holiday nights: 22:40 23:00 23:20 23:40 00:00 00:20 00:40 01:00 01:20 01:40 02:00 02:20 02:40 03:00 03:20 03:40 04:00; Schedules show exits from Barañain
	Labriteko Aldapa ↔ Beriain										
	Start 2005	End -	Length 23.1 km	Stops 22/21	Time 25/35 min.	Average speed 23.1 km/h	Frequency 60 min.	Buses 1	Service days M / T / W / T / F / S / S	Operator TCC (Transports Ciutat Comtal)	Services
Service details: Serviced zones: Iruña/Pamplona, Kordobila, Ezkirotz, Noain and Beriain
Schedule: Nights from Sunday to Thursday and bank holidays: 23:00 00:00; Friday nights: 23:00 00:00 01:00 02:00 03:00 04:00; Saturday nights and pre-bank holiday nights: 23:00 00:00 01:00 02:00 03:00 04:00 05:00 06:00; Schedules show exits from Labriteko Aldapa
	Pablo Sarasate ↔ Berriozar — Berriogoiti										
	Start 2005	End -	Length 15.0 km	Stops 16/19	Time 25/25 min.	Average speed 11.2 km/h	Frequency 20-90 min.	Buses 1-3	Service days M / T / W / T / F / S / S	Operator TCC (Transports Ciutat Comtal)	Services
Service details: Serviced zones: Iruña/Pamplona, Berriozar, Aitzoain, Berriobeiti and Berriogoiti; Note: All of the buses reach Berriozar, but only some of them go up to Berriogoiti
Schedule: Nights from Sunday to Thursday and bank holidays: (B)22:40 23:30 (B)00:10; Friday nights: 22:50 (B)23:14 23:38 00:02 (B)00:26 00:50 01:14 (B)01:38 02:02 02:26 (B)02:50 03:14 03:38 (B)04:02; Saturday nights and pre-bank holiday nights: 22:50 (B)23:14 23:38 00:02 (B)00:26 00:50 01:14 (B)01:38 02:02 02:26 (B)02:50 03:14 03:38 (B)04:02 04:26 04:50 (B)05:14 05:38 06:02; Schedules show exits from Pablo Sarasate. (B) services go up to Berriogoiti
	Nafarroako Gorteen ↔ Uharte — Gorraitz										
	Start 2005	End -	Length 21.7 km	Stops 25/23	Time 30/30 min.	Average speed 17.5 km/h	Frequency 30-120 min.	Buses 2	Service days M / T / W / T / F / S / S	Operator TCC (Transports Ciutat Comtal)	Services
Service details: Serviced zones: Iruña/Pamplona, Burlata, Atarrabia, Uharte, Olatz and Gorraitz; Note: After Olatz, the line has two branches: Ipar Gorraitz and Hegoa Gorraitz
Schedule: Nights from Sunday to Thursday and bank holidays: (N)22:45 (S)23:15 (S+N)23:45; Friday nights: (N)22:45 23:15 (S)23:45 00:15 (N)00:45 01:15 (S)01:45 02:15 (N)02:45 03:15 (S+N)03:45; Saturday nights and pre-bank holiday nights: (N)22:45 23:15 (S)23:45 00:15 (N)00:45 01:15 (S)01:45 02:15 (N)02:45 03:15 (S)03:45 04:15 (N)04:45 05:15 (S+N)05:45 06:15; Schedules show exits from Nafarroako Gorteen. (N) services go up to Ipar Gorraitz, (S) services to Hegoa Gorraitz and (S+N) services to both
	Nafarroako Gorteen ↔ Mendillorri										
	Start 2005	End -	Length 7.5 km	Stops 12/10	Time 15/15 min.	Average speed 10.5 km/h	Frequency 30 min.	Buses 1	Service days M / T / W / T / F / S / S	Operator TCC (Transports Ciutat Comtal)	Services
Service details: Serviced zones: Iruña/Pamplona
Schedule: Nights from Sunday to Thursday and bank holidays: 22:45 23:15 23:45; Friday nights: 22:45 23:15 23:45 00:15 00:45 01:15 01:45 02:15 02:45 03:15 03:45; Saturday nights and pre-bank holiday nights: 22:45 23:15 23:45 00:15 00:45 01:15 01:45 02:15 02:45 03:15 03:45 04:15 04:45 05:15 05:45; Schedules show exits from Mendillorri
	Pablo Sarasate ↔ Bexe Nafarroa										
	Start 2005	End -	Length 19.0 km	Stops 25/27	Time 35/35 min.	Average speed 12.6 km/h	Frequency 15-35 min.	Buses 3-6	Service days M / T / W / T / F / S / S	Operator TCC (Transports Ciutat Comtal)	Services
Service details: Serviced zones: Iruña/Pamplona and Antsoain
Schedule: Nights from Sunday to Thursday and bank holidays: 23:00 23:35 00:10; Friday nights: 22:50 23:15 23:40 00:05 00:30 00:55 01:20 01:45 02:10 02:35 03:00 03:25 03:50 04:15; Saturday nights and pre-bank holiday nights: 22:45 23:00 23:15 23:30 23:45 00:00 00:15 00:30 00:45 01:00 01:15 01:30 01:45 02:00 02:15 02:30 02:45 03:00 03:15 03:30 03:45 04:00 04:15 04:30 04:45 05:00 05:15 05:30 05:45 06:00 06:15 06:30; Schedules show exits from Pablo Sarasate
	Labriteko Aldapa ↔ Mutiloa										
	Start 2005	End -	Length 12.2 km	Stops 15/15	Time 25/25 min.	Average speed 101 km/h	Frequency 60-120 min.	Buses 1	Service days M / T / W / T / F / S / S	Operator TCC (Transports Ciutat Comtal)	Services
Service details: Serviced zones: Iruña/Pamplona and Mutiloa
Schedule: Nights from Sunday to Thursday and bank holidays: 23:00 00:00; Friday nights: 23:00 00:00 01:00 02:00 03:00 04:00; Saturday nights and pre-bank holiday nights: 23:00 00:00 01:00 02:00 03:00 04:00 05:00 06:00; Schedules show exits from Labriteko Aldapa
	Pablo Sarasate ↔ Orkoien										
	Start 2005	End -	Length 13.6 km	Stops 14/14	Time 30/30 min.	Average speed 13.6 km/h	Frequency 120 min.	Buses 1	Service days F / S	Operator TCC (Transports Ciutat Comtal)	Services
Service details: Serviced zones: Iruña/Pamplona and Orkoien; Note: This line does not run on weekday nights (only Fridays) or Sunday nights
Schedule: Friday nights: 23:00 01:00 03:00; Saturday nights and pre-bank holiday nights: 23:00 01:00 03:00 05:00; Schedules show exits from Pablo Sarasate
	Nafarroako Gorteen ↔ Sarriguren										
	Start 2005	End -	Length 11.3 km	Stops 13/12	Time 20/20 min.	Average speed 10.5 km/h	Frequency 40-50 min.	Buses 1	Service days M / T / W / T / F / S / S	Operator TCC (Transports Ciutat Comtal)	Services
Service details: Serviced zones: Iruña/Pamplona, Burlata and Sarriguren
Schedule: Nights from Sunday to Thursday and bank holidays: 22:50 23:30 00:10; Friday nights: 22:50 23:30 00:10 00:50 01:30 02:10 02:50 03:30 04:10; Saturday nights and pre-bank holiday nights: 22:50 23:30 00:10 00:50 01:30 02:10 02:50 03:30 04:10 04:50 05:30 06:10; Schedules show exits from Nafarroako Gorteen

== Projects ==
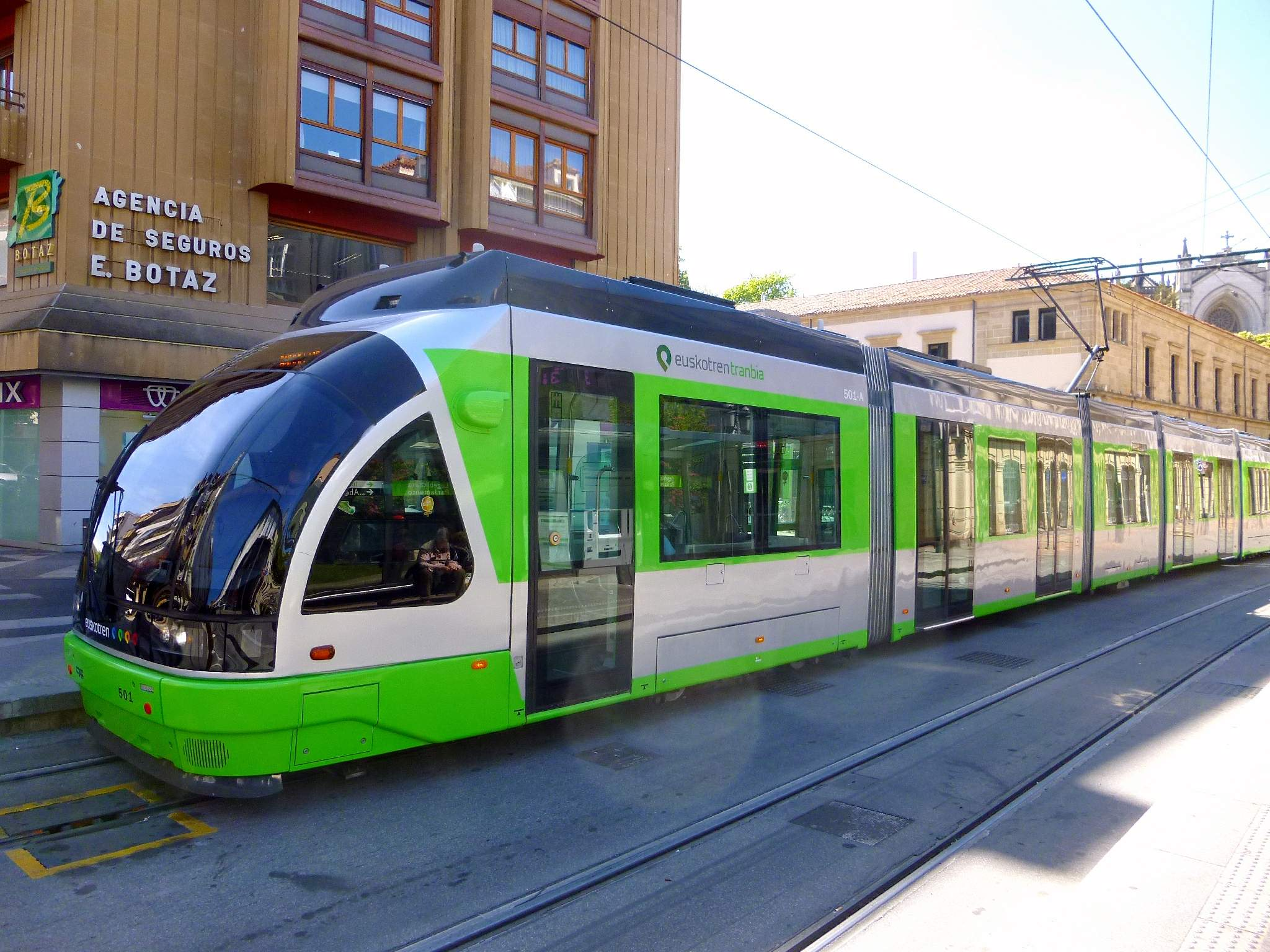
Gasteizko Tranbia (Vitoria Tram) was an inspiration for Iruñetarako Tranbia

=== Iruñetarako Tranbia (Tram for Pamplona) ===
The Iruñetarako Tranbia Proiektua (Pamplona tram project) was a project run between 2005 and 2008, involving the creation of up to three tram lines in the city of Iruña/Pamplona.

The Government of Navarre concluded, after studying different possibilities, that implementing this project would have a very good impact on the city. However, the government estimated the cost at more than 700 million euros, and finally discarded the project.

As an alternative, Iruñerriko Mankomunitatea created bus lanes on the city's biggest avenues.

Stations				Stations
Gipuzkoa	•
Ezkaba	•
REFENA	•
Buztintxuri	•
Cuatrovientos	•
Bernardino Tirapu	•
Kanala/Canal		•
Orvina		•	■	Erreniega
Txantrea		•	■	Zizur Nagusia/Zizur Mayor
San Kristobal		•	■	Donejakue Bidea/Camino de Santiago
Magdalena		•	■	RENFE
Vergel		•	■	Etxabakoitz
Runa		•	■	Arostegi
Arrotxapea	■		■	Ospitaleak/Hospitales
Gaztelu/Castillo	■		■	Pio XII
Pablo Sarasate	■		■	Antso Azkarra/Sancho el Fuerte
Yanguas y Miranda	■	↔	■	Yanguas y Miranda
Fueros	■		■	Merindades
Galicia	■		■	Media Luna
Taxoare/Tajonar	■	•		Beloso
Unibertsitate Publikoa/Universidad Pública	■	•		Mendillorri
Sadar	■	•		Erripagaña
Arena	■	•		Nafarroako Erresuma/Reino de Navarra
Galaria	■	•		Europar Batasuna/Unión Europea
		•		Bertiz
			•	Ezkabazabal
			•	Serapio Huici
			•	San Andres
			•	Areta
			•	Ugarrandia
			•	Zubiarte

=== Sare Nagusia (Rapid System) ===
After the Pamplona Tram Project, two options were suggested: create bus rapid transit (BRT) system or a transit bus optimized system. Iruñerriko Mankomunitatea decided to develop the first idea, combining it with the Pamplona Tram Project concept, where more lines can be created (up to five in the first phase) and the other buses can use the same reserved platform.

The new system will be accompanied by a total change of the current bus lines and it will be operating before 2024.

BRT (in Spanish, BTR) lines will run 98% of their route on a separate, independent platform. Buses, 33 estimated in the first phase, will be 100% electric, but since there will be no catenary, it will be stored in batteries that will be recharged after each trip.

Line	Characteristics										
BTR1	Erdia ↔ Serapio Huici										
BTR1	Start -	End -	Length 7.8 km	Stops 17	Time 30 min.	Average speed 23.5 km/h	Frequency 8 min.	Buses 6	Service days M / T / W / T / F / S / S	Operator TCC (Transports Ciutat Comtal)	Services
BTR1	Service details: Serviced zones: Iruña/Pamplona, Barañain, Burlata/Burlada, Atarrabia/Villava										
BTR1	Basic data: Coverage: 92,926 people; Annual commercial distance: 518,065 km; Annual service time: 29,646 hours; Annual estimated ridership: 7,026,274 rides; Travellers per distance: 13.6 travellers/km; Length of vehicle: 24 m; Travellers per expedition: 97.5 travellers										
BTR2	Irunlarrea ↔ Bidaburua										
BTR2	Start -	End -	Length 7.6 km	Stops 20	Time 25 min.	Average speed 23.0 km/h	Frequency 8 min.	Buses 6	Service days M / T / W / T / F / S / S	Operator TCC (Transports Ciutat Comtal)	Services
BTR2	Service details: Serviced zones: Iruña/Pamplona, Antsoain, Burlata/Burlada and Atarrabia/Villava										
BTR2	Basic data: Coverage: 92,902 people; Annual commercial distance: 543,811 km; Annual service time: 30,094 hours; Annual estimated ridership: 3,404,868 rides; Travellers per distance: 6.3 travellers/km; Length of vehicle: 18 m; Travellers per expedition: 44.7 travellers										
BTR3	Merindades ↔ Euskal Herria										
BTR3	Start -	End -	Length 11.5 km	Stops 27	Time 35 min.	Average speed 25.0 km/h	Frequency 9 min.	Buses 8	Service days M / T / W / T / F / S / S	Operator TCC (Transports Ciutat Comtal)	Services
BTR3	Service details: Serviced zones: Iruña/Pamplona, Burlata/Burlada, Atarrabia/Villava and Antsoain										
BTR3	Basic data: Coverage: 123,509 people; Annual commercial distance: 779,273 km; Annual service time: 40,328 hours; Annual estimated ridership: 8,188,885 rides; Travellers per distance: 10.5 travellers/km; Length of vehicle: 24 m; Travellers per expedition: 120.5 travellers										
BTR4	Erreniega ↔ Bertiz										
BTR4	Start -	End -	Length 11.6 km	Stops 19	Time 40 min.	Average speed 26.2 km/h	Frequency 8 min.	Buses 8	Service days M / T / W / T / F / S / S	Operator TCC (Transports Ciutat Comtal)	Services
BTR4	Service details: Serviced zones: Iruña/Pamplona, Zizur Nagusia/Zizur Mayor, Burlata/Burlada and Sarriguren										
BTR4	Basic data: Coverage: 50,636 people; Annual commercial distance: 805,574 km; Annual service time: 54,418 hours; Annual estimated ridership: 4,204,647 rides; Travellers per distance: 5.3 travellers/km; Length of vehicle: 18 m; Travellers per expedition: 60.1 travellers										
BTR5	Gipuzkoa ↔ Galaria										
BTR5	Start -	End -	Length 7.4 km	Stops 15	Time 25 min.	Average speed 18.0 km/h	Frequency 8 min.	Buses 6	Service days M / T / W / T / F / S / S	Operator TCC (Transports Ciutat Comtal)	Services
BTR5	Service details: Serviced zones: Iruña/Pamplona, Berriozar and Kordobila/Cordovilla										
BTR5	Basic data: Coverage: 56,894 people; Annual commercial distance: 742,731 km; Annual service time: 41,282 hours; Annual estimated ridership: 4,282,081 rides; Travellers per distance: 5.8 travellers/km; Length of vehicle: 18 m; Travellers per expedition: 32.6 travellers										

== In folklore ==
The Encierro de la Villavesa/Billabesaren Entzierroa ("running of the town bus") started in Pamplona on 15 July 1984 when, after the end of the Sanfermines festival and its associated running of the bulls, youths would run before the earliest urban bus entering the traditional encierro course. Starting in 1990, the Pamplona bus company detoured the early bus to defuse the risk. Currently, the youths run before a cyclist in a yellow jersey as an homage to the Navarrese cycling champion Miguel Induráin.

== Images ==
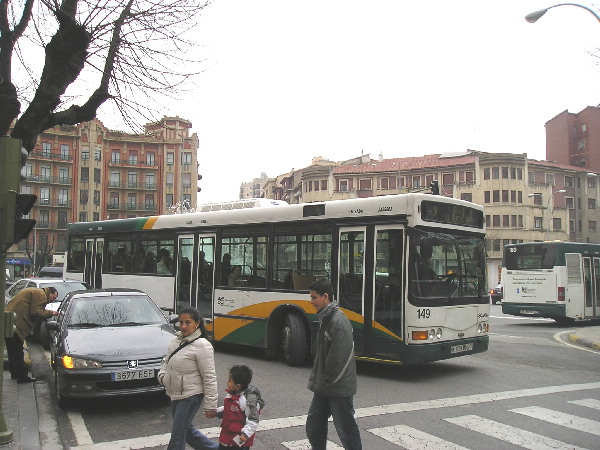
Old line 3 bus in Zabalguneak
