= Cuenca de Pamplona =

Coordinates: 42°47′N 1°43′W

Cuenca de Pamplona / Iruñerria
- Eskualdea / Comarca
- Country: Spain
- Autonomous community: Navarre
- Capital: Pamplona
- Municipalities: List: See text
- Elevation: 449 m (1,473 ft)

Population (2007)
  - Total: 329,531
- Time zone: UTC+1 (CET)
  - Summer (DST): UTC+2 (CEST)

The Cuenca de Pamplona (Basque: Iruñerria) is a comarca in Navarre, Spain. The Spanish word cuenca means 'basin', referring to a 'territory surrounded of mountains or hills'. The metropolitan area of Pamplona has expanded at the expense of the cereal producing surrounding countryside.

== Municipalities ==
Ansoáin, Aranguren, Barañáin, Belascoáin, Beriáin, Berrioplano, Berriozar, Bidaurreta, Burlada, Ciriza, Cizur, Echarri, Egüés, Etxauri, Galar, Goñi, Huarte, Iza, Juslapeña, Noáin - Valle de Elorz, Ollo, Olza, Orcoyen, Pamplona, Tiebas-Muruarte de Reta, Villava – Atarrabia, Zabalza and Zizur Mayor/Zizur Nagusia.

== See also ==
- Category:People from Cuenca de Pamplona
- Sadar (river)
- Gazólaz
- Mancomunidad de la Comarca de Pamplona
