= CD Subiza =

Association football club in Spain

Subiza
- Full name: Club Deportivo Subiza
- Founded: 19 October 1984; 42 years ago
- Ground: Sotoburu, Subiza, Galar, Navarre, Spain
- Capacity: 1,000
- Chairman: Ismael Amatriain
- Manager: César Monasterio
- League: Tercera Federación – Group 15
- 2025–26: Tercera Federación – Group 15, 4th of 18
Home colours	Away colours

Club Deportivo Subiza is a Spanish football team based in Subiza, Galar in the autonomous community of Navarre. Founded in 1984, it plays in Tercera Federación – Group 15, playing their home matches at the Estadio Sotoburu, with a capacity of 1,000 people.

== History ==
In the 1980s, the company Potasas de Navarra S.A. went bankrupt due to the depletion of its mineral deposit, coinciding with the discovery of a new site in the village of Subiza — a small settlement with around one hundred inhabitants. These circumstances led to the foundation of Club Deportivo Subiza on 19 October 1984.

Originally a modest initiative, the club wore red shirts with black shorts. In its early years, it remained outside the structure of the Navarre Football Federation, focusing instead on friendly matches, participation in local tournaments such as the Higa de Monreal Tournament, and gradual sporting development. In 1986, the company Potasas de Subiza S.A. was established. Around the same time, the residents of Beriáin — then the most populous town in the municipality of Cendea de Galar — began advocating for municipal independence, supported by their relatively favorable economic situation.

In the early 1990s, the separation of Beriáin from the municipality of Cendea de Galar was nearly complete and was formalized in 1992 when Beriáin became an independent municipality. This left Galar with just over a thousand residents and without any prominent football representation. It was at this time that CD Subiza decided to take a major step by registering with the Navarre Football Federation, which they officially did in 1993. The club began competing in the Primera Regional, where it achieved fifth place in both the 1993–94 and 1994–95 seasons with a modest but well-organized squad.

Drawing primarily from players based in Pamplona and surrounding municipalities, Subiza improved its performance in 1995–96, finishing fourth. The 1996–97 season proved particularly successful, as the club won its group and claimed its first league title. Although they qualified for the promotion play-offs to the Regional Preferente, they were unsuccessful, finishing fourth in the group. However, the 1997–98 campaign saw further progress: Subiza secured a second consecutive league title and finished second in the promotion play-offs, behind CD Etxarri-Aranatz, which was enough to earn promotion to the Regional Preferente.

The club made its debut in Regional Preferente in the 1998–99 season, finishing in 13th place and managing to remain in the division. Retaining much of the same squad for the following season and adding a few reinforcements, Subiza improved its standing with a 7th-place finish, consolidating its position in a league where it had found a competitive rhythm.

Subiza achieved their first-ever promotion to the Tercera División in 2002. On 15 June 2020, the club reached an agreement with CA Osasuna to become their second reserve team, behind CA Osasuna B.

== Season to season ==
=== As an independent team ===
Season	Tier	Division	Place	Copa del Rey
1993–94	6	1ª Reg.	5th	
1994–95	6	1ª Reg.	5th	
1995–96	6	1ª Reg.	4th	
1996–97	6	1ª Reg.	1st	
1997–98	6	1ª Reg.	1st	
1998–99	5	Reg. Pref.	13th	
1999–2000	5	Reg. Pref.	7th	
2000–01	5	Reg. Pref.	12th	
2001–02	5	Reg. Pref.	1st	
2002–03	4	3ª	19th	
2003–04	5	Reg. Pref.	5th	
2004–05	4	3ª	18th	
2005–06	5	Reg. Pref.	11th	
2006–07	5	Reg. Pref.	9th	

Season	Tier	Division	Place	Copa del Rey
2007–08	5	Reg. Pref.	13th	
2008–09	5	Reg. Pref.	11th	
2009–10	5	Reg. Pref.	5th	
2010–11	5	Reg. Pref.	2nd	
2011–12	5	Reg. Pref.	1st	
2012–13	4	3ª	18th	
2013–14	5	Reg. Pref.	3rd	
2014–15	4	3ª	15th	
2015–16	4	3ª	10th	
2016–17	4	3ª	11th	
2017–18	4	3ª	13th	
2018–19	4	3ª	14th	
2019–20	4	3ª	18th	

=== As a reserve team ===
Season	Tier	Division	Place
2020–21	4	3ª	10th / 3rd
2021–22	5	3ª RFEF	2nd
2022–23	5	3ª Fed.	2nd
2023–24	5	3ª Fed.	1st
2024–25	4	2ª Fed.	17th
2025–26	5	3ª Fed.	4th
2026–27	5	3ª Fed.	

- 1 season in Segunda Federación
- 10 seasons in Tercera División
- 5 seasons in Tercera Federación/Tercera División RFEF
