= Ibero =

Ibero usually refers to things related to the Iberian Peninsula, including:

- Ibero-America, countries in the Americas which were formerly colonies of Spain or Portugal
- Ibero-Caucasian, proposed language family
- Ibero-Celtic, Celtic language and people of the Iberian Peninsula
- Ibero-Maurisian, North African culture thought to have spread from the Iberian Peninsula
- Ibero-Romance, Romance languages that developed on the Iberian Peninsula

== Other uses ==
- Ibero, town in Olza, Navarre, Spain
- Universidad Iberoamericana, Mexican university known as Ibero
