= Public University of Navarre =

University in Navarre, Spain

Coordinates: 42°48′02″N 1°38′13″W

- Spanish: Universidad Pública de Navarra; Basque: Nafarroako Unibertsitate Publikoa
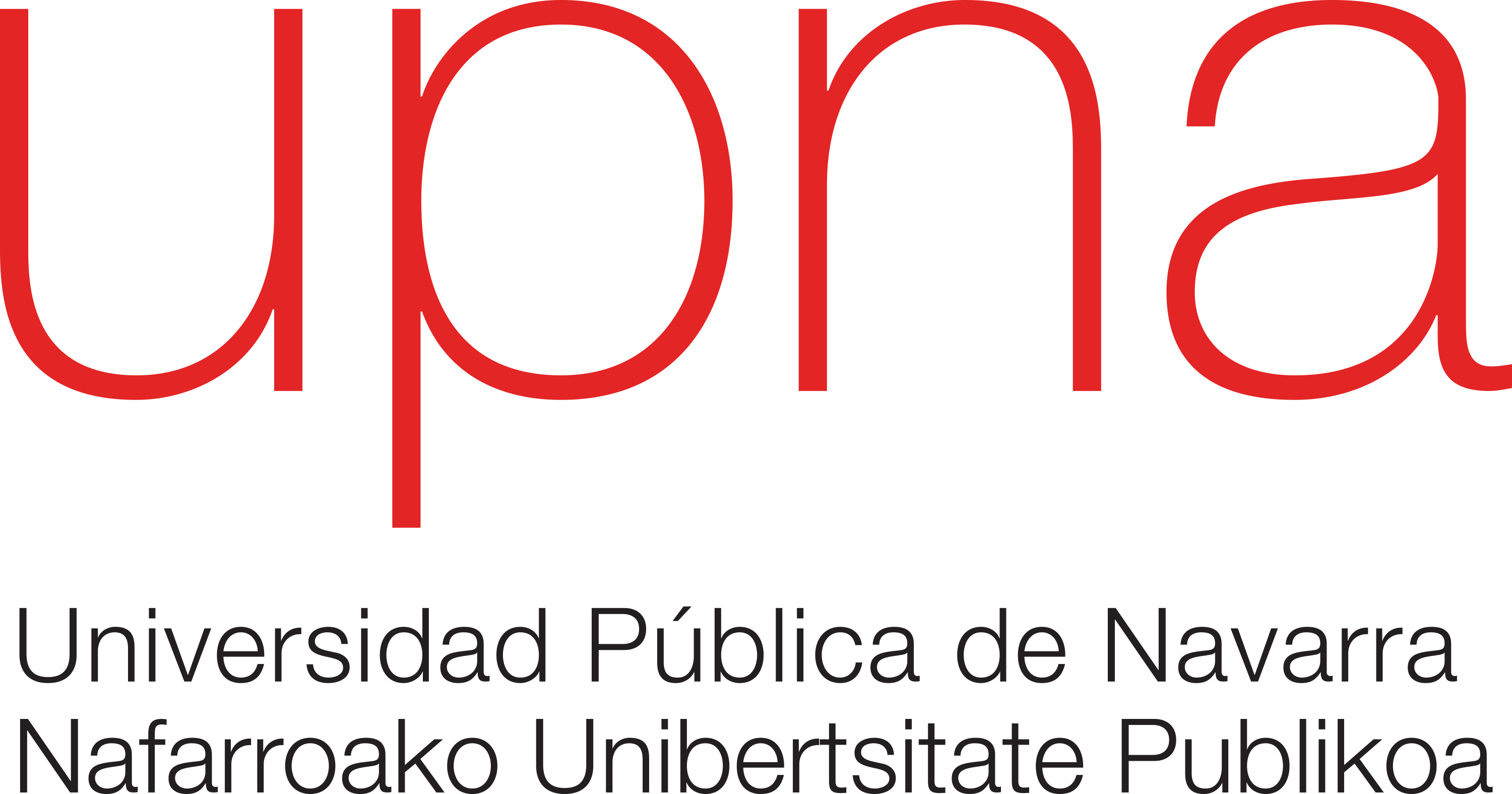
- Latin: Publica Universitas Navarrensis
- Type: Public
- Established: April 21, 1987
- Affiliations: Campus Iberus and G9 of Universities
- Rector: Ramón Gonzalo
- Faculty: 1,064
- Administrative staff: 505
- Total staff: 1,569
- Students: 10,000 (2022–2023)
- Undergraduates: 7,814
- Postgraduates: 869
- Doctoral students: 505
- Location: Pamplona and Tudela, Navarre, Spain
- Campus: Pamplona and Tudela
- Colors: "Foral" red
- Website: http://www.unavarra.es/

The Public University of Navarre (Basque: Nafarroako Unibertsitate Publikoa; Spanish: Universidad Pública de Navarra), also known by its acronym UPNA or NUP, is a public university created in 1987 by the government of the Spanish autonomous region of Navarre (Basque: Nafarroa, Spanish: Navarra). It has three campuses, located in Pamplona and Tudela. Its activity began in 1989.

The main campus is located in Pamplona, in the outskirts of the city, near CA Osasuna's El Sadar Stadium, and a new campus was opened in Tudela, a city in southern Navarre, in the 2008 - 2009 academic year. The Health Sciences Faculty (Facultad de Ciencias de la Salud) was placed off-campus near the city's two biggest hospitals.

Currently there are about 10,000 students enrolled in twenty-five different degrees, the most popular of which are Business Administration and several different engineering degrees.

There are also many foreign students taking part in the Erasmus programme, International Student Exchange Programs, Virrey Palafox, or other exchange programs.

== History ==
The Public University of Navarre was created in 1987 by the Parliament of Navarre, as an initiative by then president Gabriel Urralburu. In 1989, classes started in El Sario building, and the construction of the main building of the campus (Aulario) began. In 1990, the library and department buildings were finished. In 1993, the university elected its first rector. In 1995, they approved their first statutes, and in 1996 it already had 10,000 registered students.

In 1997, the Grupo 9 de Universidades (G9 of Universities) was founded as an alliance between nine Spanish universities, with its headquarters being in the Arrosadia Campus of the Public University of Navarre.

In 1998, both the dining room and the cafeteria were inaugurated. Two years later it already had a sports center (the Pabellón Universitario de Navarra), a modern facility with fronton, sports court and swimming pool.

In 2006, the university began its activities in Tudela. A year later it opened the student residence Los Abedules, and in 2008 the Tudela campus was finished. That year they also celebrated the first plenary session of the Student Council. In 2011, Campus Iberus was created, a consortium with the universities of Zaragoza, Lleida and La Rioja, which serves as an international excellence campus for universities located alongside the riverbank of the Ebro. In 2019, they began teaching a degree in Medicine, and in 2022 the university surpassed 10,000 pre-registrations.

Since the year 1998, the Brunet Foundation, part of the university, awards the Jaime Brunet International Prize and the Jaime Brunet University Prize.

=== Rectors of the Public University of Navarra since its foundation ===
- Pedro Burillo López (1988-1991, Management Commission)
- Pedro Burillo López (1991)
- Alberto González Guerrero (1991–1992)
- Juan García Blasco (1992–1995)
- Antonio Pérez Prados (1995–1999 and 1999–2003)
- Pedro Burillo López (2003–2007)
- Julio Lafuente López (2007–2011 and 2011–2015)
- Alfonso Carlosena (2015–2019)
- Ramón Gonzalo García (2019–)

== Teaching ==
The Public University of Navarre currently offers 25 undergraduate programs and 7 double degrees, as well as over 30 postgraduate programs.

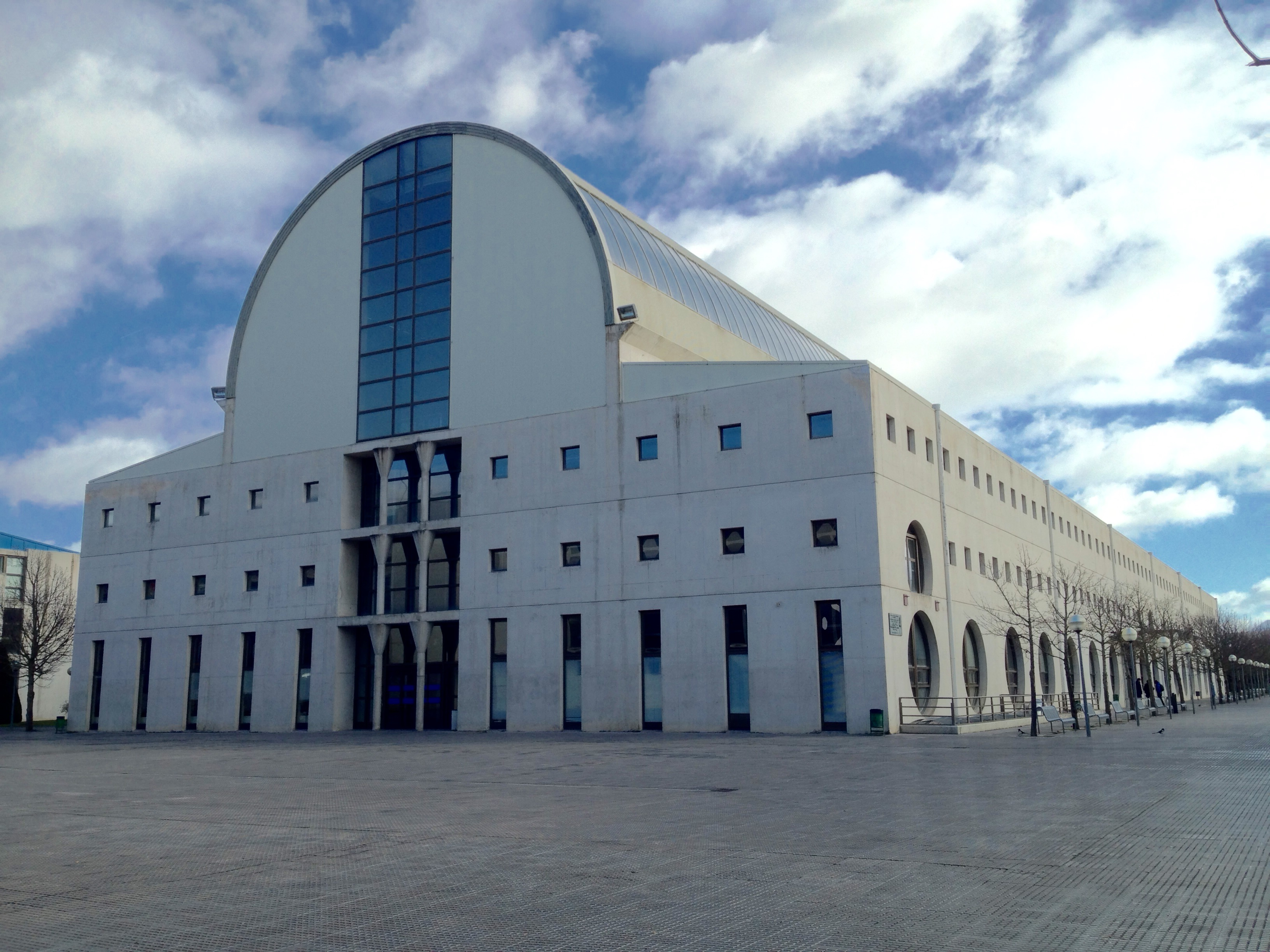
The library building in the Arrosadia Campus (Pamplona).

=== Faculties and Schools ===
- Faculty of Economic and Business Sciences
- Faculty of Social, Human and Education Sciences
- Faculty of Legal Sciences
- Faculty of Health Sciences
- Technical School for Agricultural Engineering and Biosciences
- Technical School for Industrial, Informatics and Telecommunications Engineering

== Facilities ==
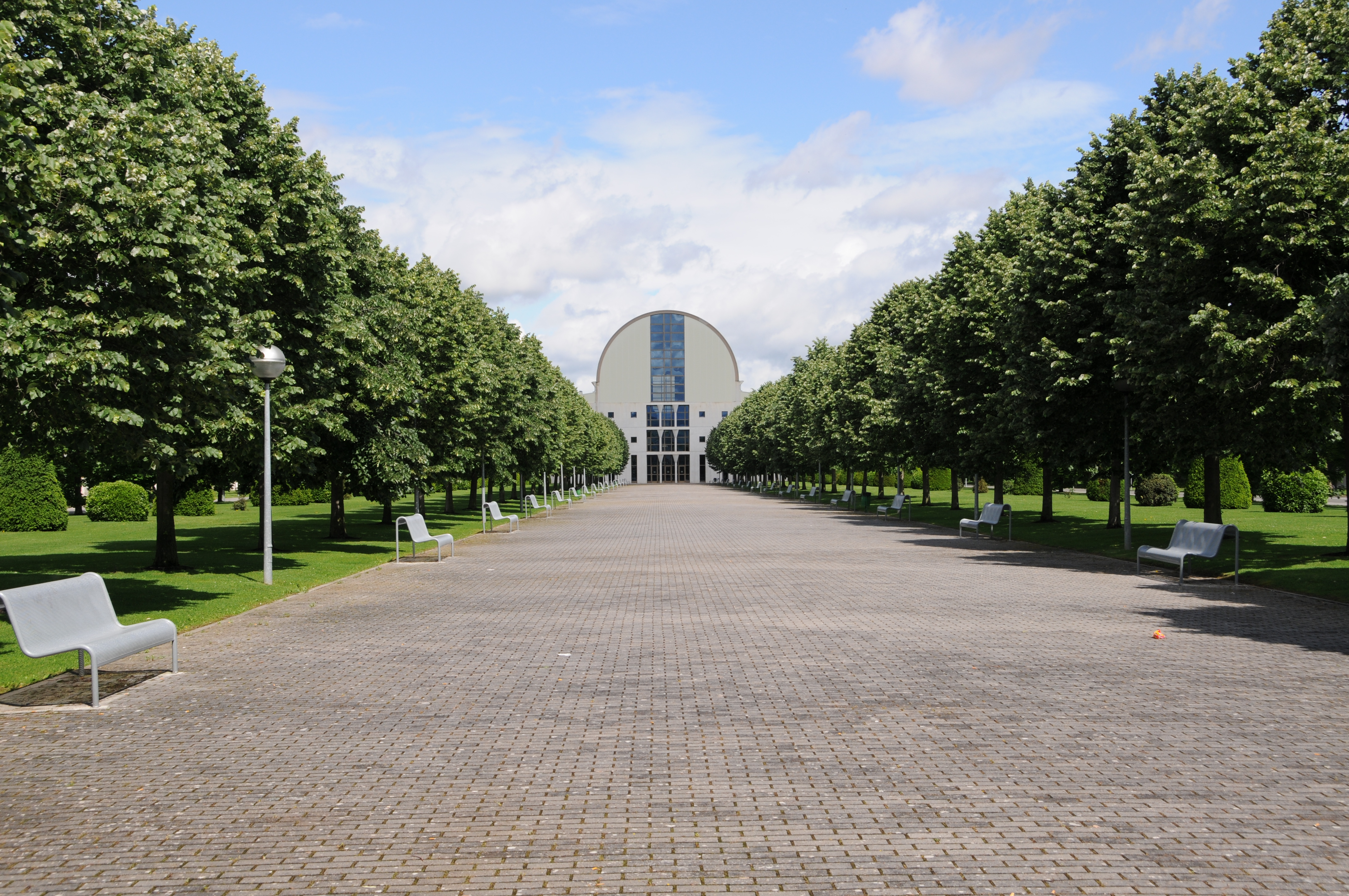
The Arrosadia Campus (Pamplona).

=== Arrosadia Campus ===
Designed by Sáenz de Oiza. It has more than 26 urbanised hectares and in located in la Milagrosa, a district in the southern flank of Pamplona. This campus brings together the Aulario (classroom building), the Library, seven departmental buildings, the Rectorate, the Administration and Management building, the Workshops and Laboratories building, the cafeteria, dining rooms, and the El Sario building.

=== Tudela Campus ===
The Tudela Campus is located next to the Tarazona Highway (N-121-C), between the ETI Polytechnic Integrated Center and the farmers' cooperative. The Tudela Campus facilities came into operation in the 2008-2009 academic year. The campus is made up of the Lecture Building, the Physiotherapy and Engineering buildings and the library. It has more than 300 students belonging to the two degrees it offers, and the Experience Classroom.

=== Health Sciences' Building ===
The Health Sciences building is located on the grounds of the University Hospital of Navarre (in spanish: Hospital Universitario de Navarra), with the department of the same name and the University School of Health Studies. A process is currently underway to build a new building, which would be completed by 2025.

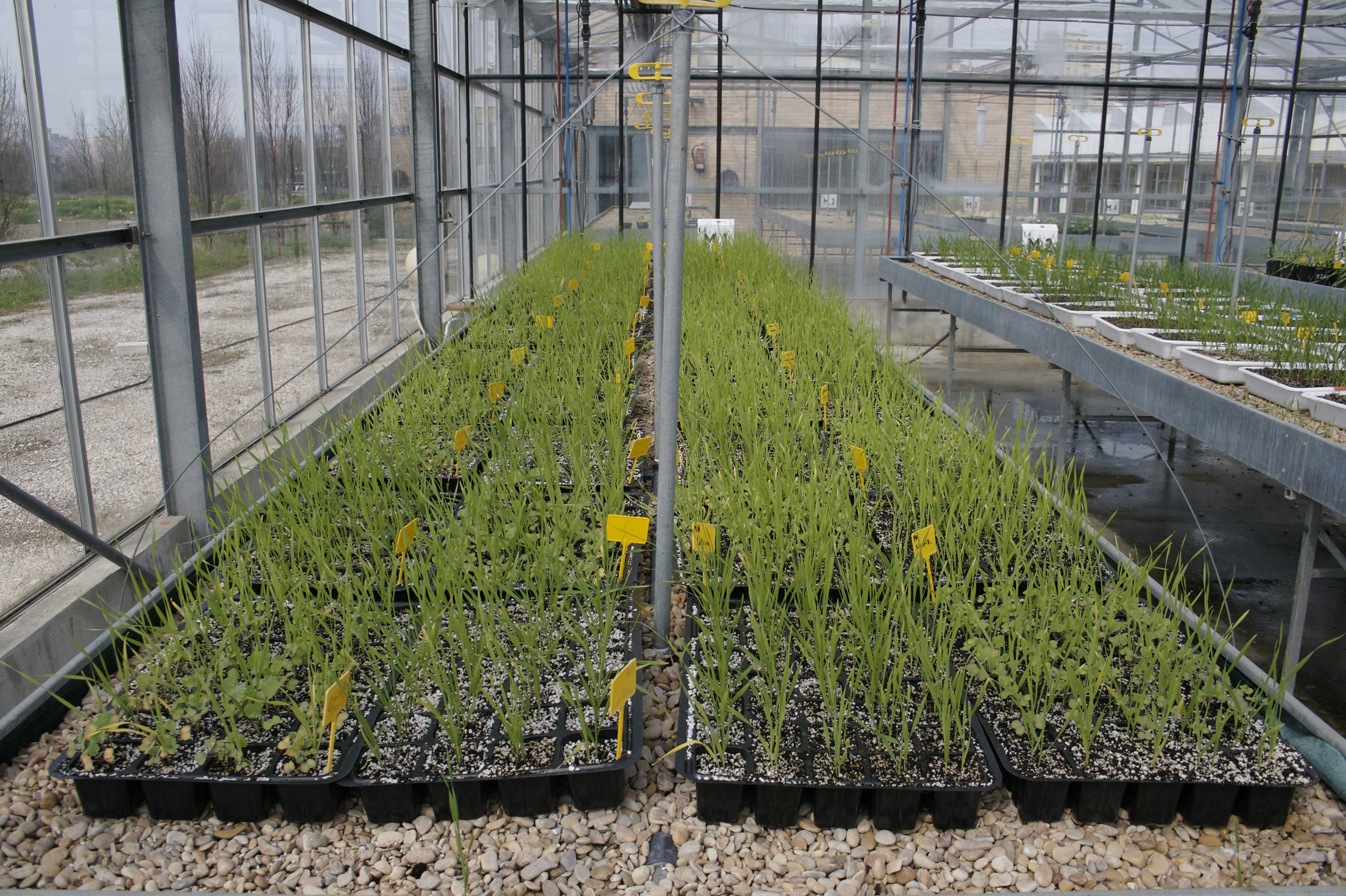
Heated greenhouses of the practice farm.

=== Practice farm ===
The Agricultural Practices and Research Farm is located next to El Sario, on the Arrosadia Campus.

=== Sport facilities ===
Also next to El Sario and the practice farm there are the UPNA Sports Facilities. These facilities currently have:

- Three soccer fields: One of sand, another of grass and another of artificial grass.
- Natural grass rugby field.
- Practice golf course and putting-green.
- Covered fronton.
- The University Pavilion.
- Indoor swimming pool.
- 2 sports courts: one covered and one uncovered.
- Tennis courts: Covered and uncovered.
- Weight room.
- Multipurpose rooms and other rooms.

In the past, the elite teams of SDC San Antonio for handball and Xota FS for futsal played, as well as the federated teams of the Club Deportivo Universidad Pública de Navarra, in its various sections (soccer, basketball, futsal...).

Currently, the facilities are used mainly by external federated clubs, tournaments or championships, or by people who are part of the university for their free use or for the Public University of Navarra Tournament that is held twice a year (autumn and spring) in the sports modalities of:

- Team sports: Women's and men's futsal, women's and men's 3x3 soccer and basketball, and volleyball.
- Individual sports: Basque pelota, tennis, climbing and golf.

=== Other areas ===
The university also has other integrated areas on campus such as:

- Estanislao de Aranzadi School of Legal Practice.
- Training and Socio-Labor Practice School.
- Higher Language Center.
- Fundación Universidad Sociedad.
- Experience Classroom.

== Research centers ==
The university also has specific infrastructures for research activity, such as the Agrobiotechnology Institute (IdAB) and the Jerónimo de Ayanz Electronics and Telecommunications R&D Center, located on the Arrosadia Campus.

In December 2014, two research institutes on smart cities and advanced materials, called the SmartCities Research Institute (ISC) and the Institute of Advanced Materials and Mathematics (INAMAT^{2}), were created with the aim of contributing to these fields and gaining international projection.

In 2016, the Institute for Innovation & Sustainable Development in Food Chain (IS-FOOD) and the Institute for Advanced Research in Business and Economics (INARBE) were created, and in November 2017 the Institute for Multidisciplinary Research in Applied Biology (IMAB) and the Institute for Advanced Social Research (I-COMMUNITAS) were also founded.

== Connections with public transport ==
The Pamplona City Transport lines available to reach the Public University of Navarra are L1, L6 and L9. There are also L11 bus stops very close.

The Tudela Urban Transport lines available to travel to the UPNA campus in Tudela are line 2 and line 3.
