= Olloki =

Coordinates: 42°56′44″N 1°29′22″W

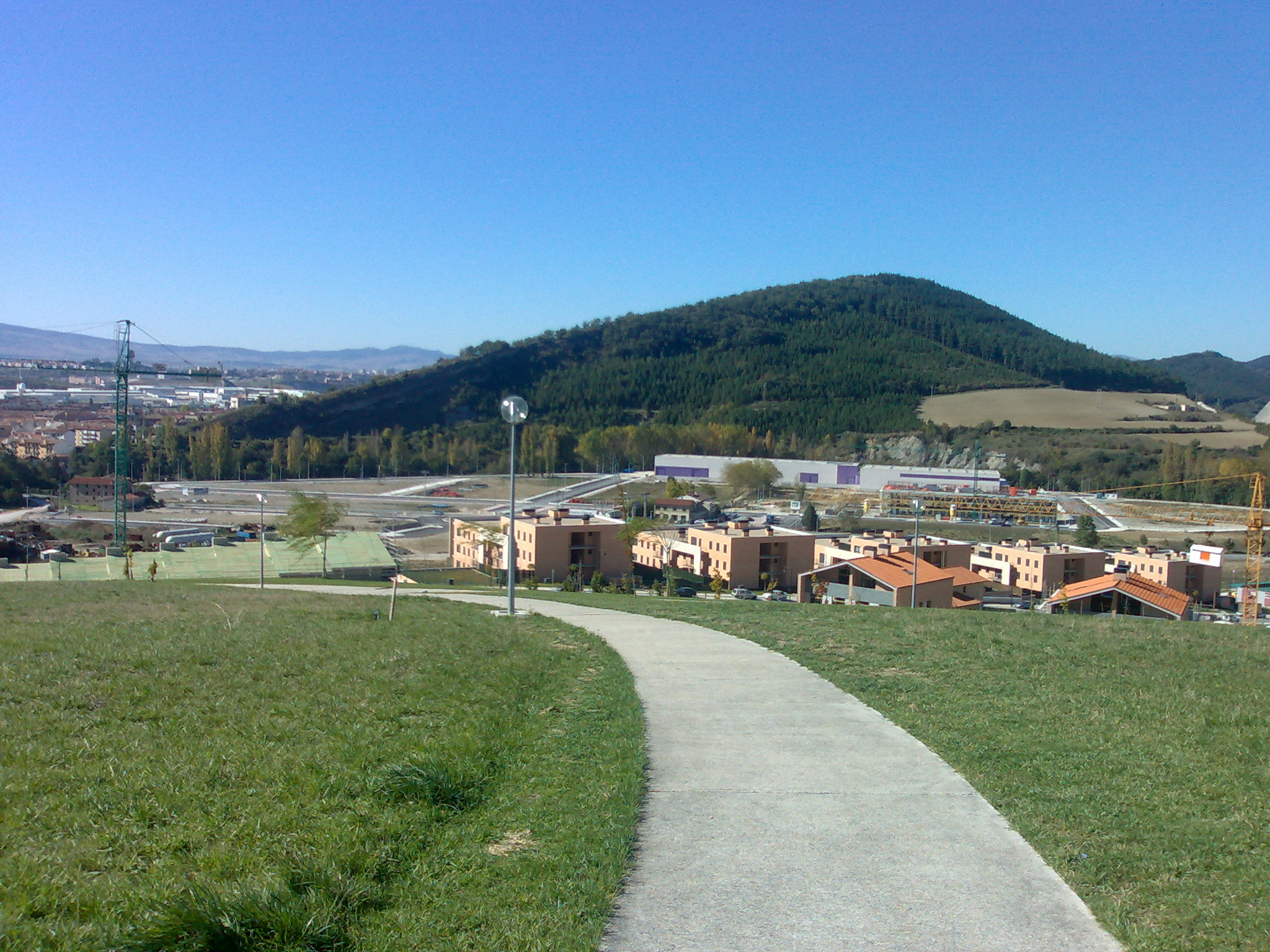
Esteribar Olloki contusion.

Olloki is a village in Navarre (Spain). Until December 1, 2005, it was called a "concejo" —a sort of unincorporated area — when it joined Esteribar.
