= Salinas de Ibargoiti =

Coordinates: 42°42′N 1°29′W

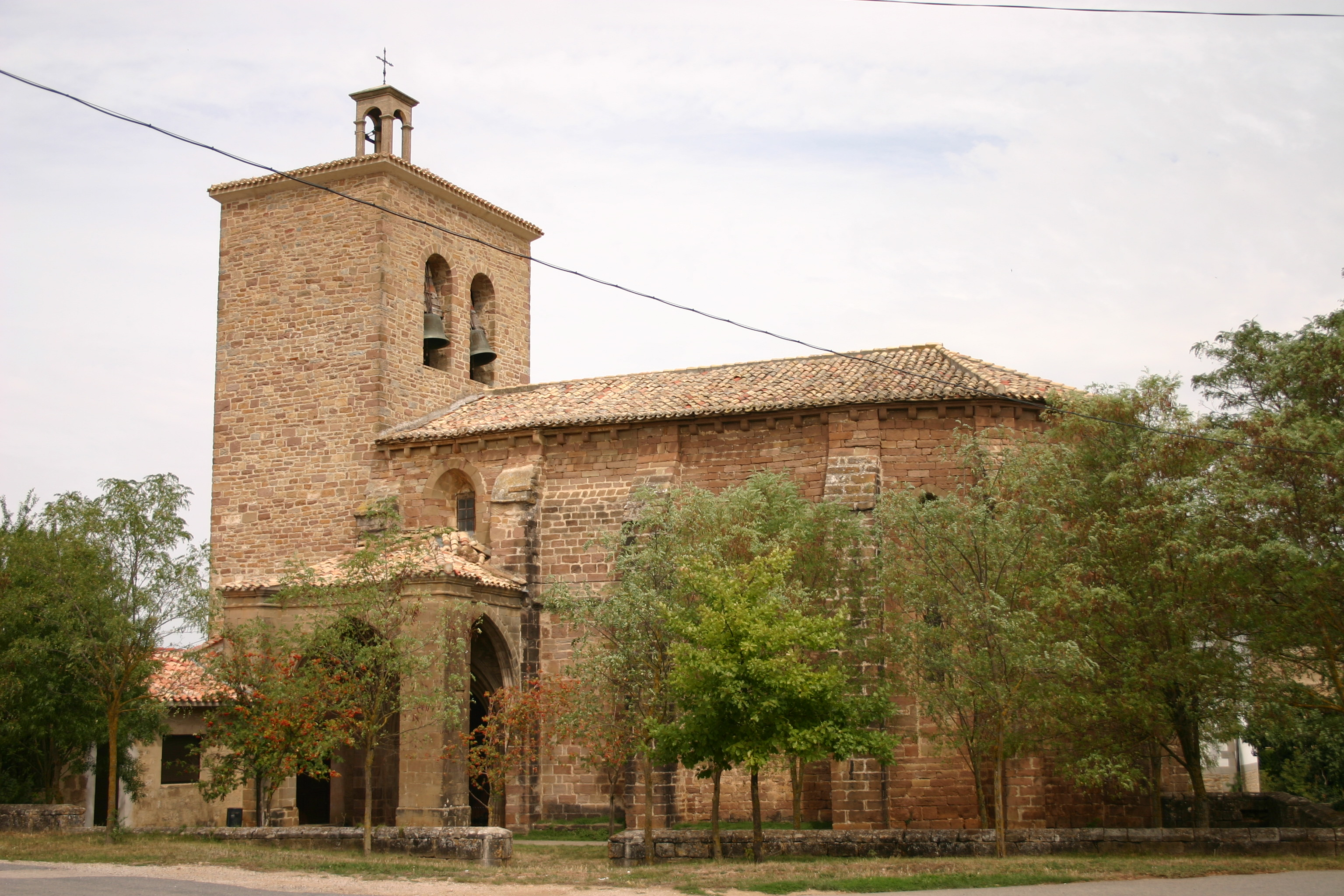
San Miguel Church.

Salinas de Ibargoiti (Getze Ibargoiti in Basque) is a village located in the province of Navarre, Spain. Salinas belongs to the Municipality of Ibargoiti. It is near Pamplona, about 22 km from the center of the city. The Pyrenees' highway goes past the village. When the highway opens, it will provide an easy route between Pamplona and Jaca.

The Way of St. James passes through the village and many pilgrims visit it in summer.
