= Ansoáin – Antsoain =

Ansoáin / Antsoain
- Municipality
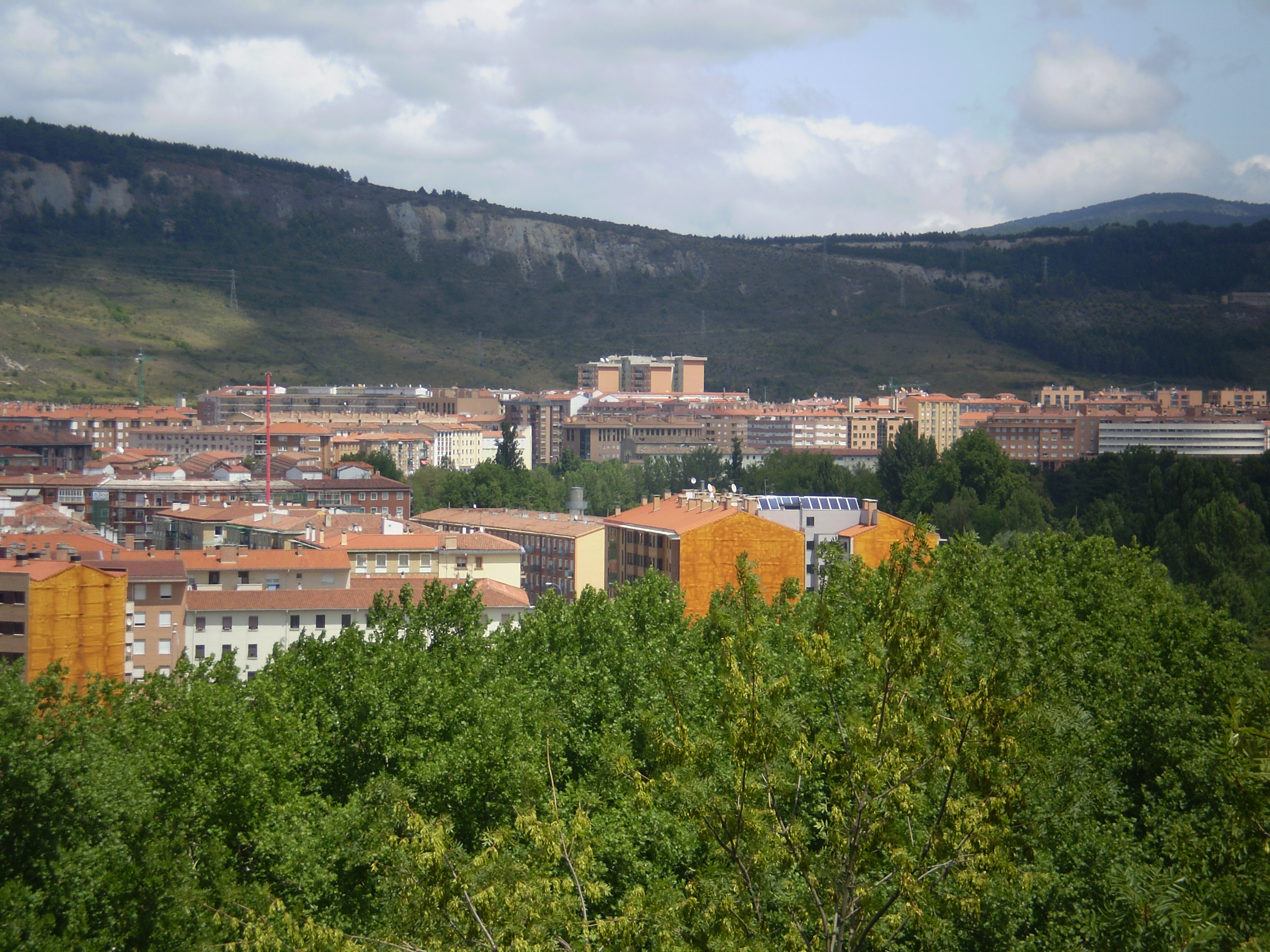
- Ansoáin

- Flag Coat of arms

- Location in Spain
- Coordinates: 42°50′8″N 1°38′22″W
- Country: Spain
- Autonomous Community: Navarre
- Province: Navarre
- Comarca / Eskualdea: Cuenca de Pamplona

Government
  - Mayor: Antonio Gila Gila (PSN-PSOE)

Area
  - Total: 2 km^{2} (0.77 sq mi)
- Elevation (AMSL): 426 m (1,398 ft)

Population (2025-01-01)
  - Total: 10,663
  - Density: 5,300/km^{2} (14,000/sq mi)
- Time zone: UTC+1 (CET)
  - Summer (DST): UTC+2 (CEST (GMT +2))
- Postal code: 31013
- Area code: +34 (Spain) + 948 (Navarre)
- Website: Town Council

Ansoain (Basque: Antsoain) is a town and municipality located in the province and autonomous community of Navarra, northern Spain.
