= Zizur Mayor/Zizur Nagusia =

Zizur Mayor / Zizur Nagusia
- Municipality
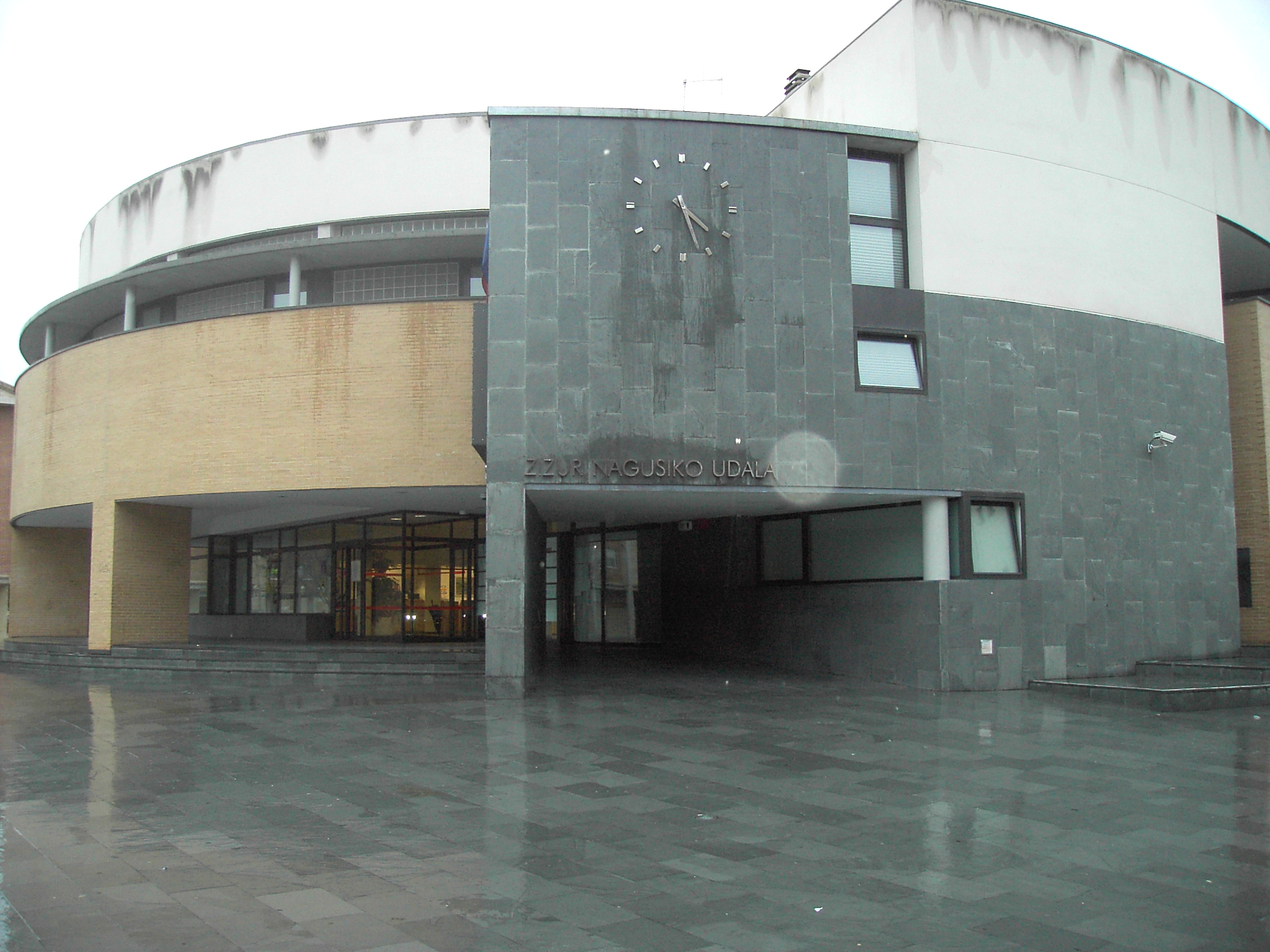
- Town hall

- Flag Coat of arms

- Location within Spain Location within Navarre
- Coordinates: 42°47′12″N 1°41′27″W
- Country: Spain
- Autonomous Community: Navarre
- Province: Navarre
- Comarca: Cuenca de Pamplona / Iruñerria

Government
  - Mayor: Jon Gondán (Geroa Bai)

Area
  - Total: 5.6 km^{2} (2.2 sq mi)
- Elevation (AMSL): 470 m (1,540 ft)

Population (2012)
  - Total: 14,084
  - Density: 2,500/km^{2} (6,500/sq mi)
- Time zone: UTC+1 (CET)
  - Summer (DST): UTC+2 (CEST (GMT +2))
- Postal code: 31180
- Area code: +34 (Spain) + 948 (Navarre)
- Website: Town Hall

Zizur Mayor (Basque: Zizur Nagusia) is a municipality in the Spanish autonomous community of Navarra, in northern Spain.

It is located 5 kilometres (3.1 mi) away from Pamplona, the capital city of Navarra, and, according to the local authority's website, it is home to 13,373 inhabitants.

== Notable people ==
- César Azpilicueta, international footballer; winner of UEFA Champions League in 2021 and UEFA Europa League in 2013 and 2019 with Chelsea.
