= Barañain =

- Municipality
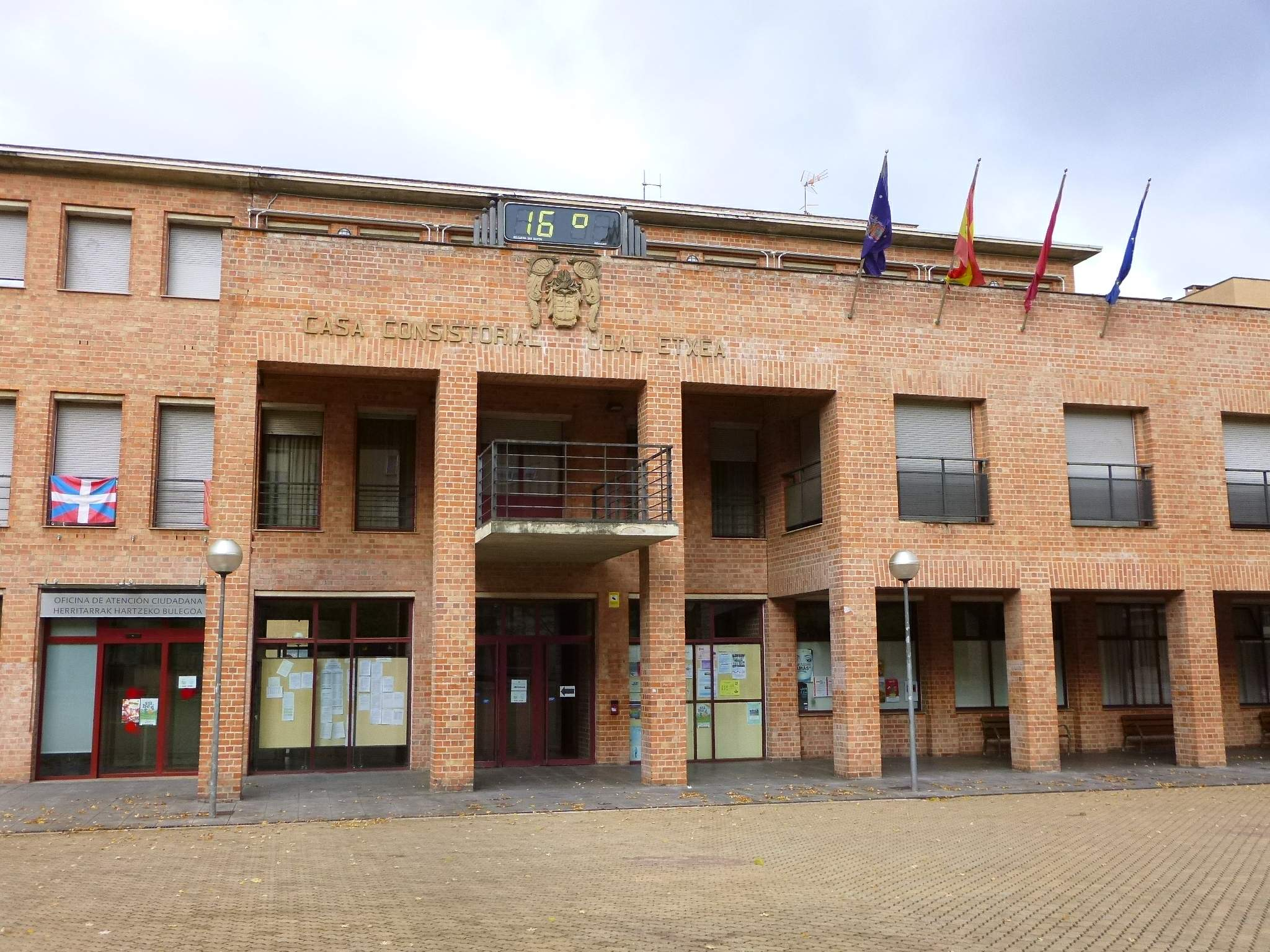
- Town hall

- Flag Coat of arms

- Location in Navarre Barañain (Spain)
- Coordinates: 42°48′15″N 1°41′0″W
- Country: Spain
- Autonomous Community: Navarre
- Province: Navarre
- Eskualdea / Comarca: Cuenca de Pamplona

Government
  - Mayor: María Lecumberri (Navarra Suma)

Area
  - Total: 1.39 km^{2} (0.54 sq mi)
- Elevation (AMSL): 434 m (1,424 ft)

Population (2025-01-01)
  - Total: 19,642
  - Density: 14,100/km^{2} (36,600/sq mi)
- Time zone: UTC+1 (CET)
  - Summer (DST): UTC+2 (CEST (GMT +2))
- Postal code: 31010
- Area code: +34 (Spain) + 948 (Navarre)
- Website: Town Council

Barañain (in Basque and officially; Spanish Barañáin) is a town and municipality located in the province and autonomous community of Navarre, northern Spain.

It is located in the outskirts of Pamplona, in the Pamplona Basin and 5 km west of the capital of the community, Pamplona, forming part of its metropolitan area. In 2017 it had a population of 20,124 inhabitants (INE), making it the third largest municipality in terms of population in the community, behind Pamplona and Tudela.

== Geography ==
Barañáin is located on a plateau surrounded by the rivers Arga and Elorz, whose erosive action has created ravines whose slopes are progressively softened towards the west, where both currents have their confluence. To the east, this plateau communicates with that of Pamplona, of which it can be considered the western end. The Arga defines most of the northern boundary of the municipality, while the river Elorz, which flows to the south, serves as a boundary in the last five hundred metres before its mouth.

== Administration ==
Until 1987, Barañáin was part of the Cendea de Cizur. That year it was constituted as its own local entity. Historically, Barañáin has been a predominantly socialist town, since from 1979 to 1995 it has been governed by the PSN-PSOE without interruption and with the same candidate.

In the General Elections, the PSOE is always the most voted list with a great distance between the other parties.

=== Municipal Elections 2015 ===
In the 2015 municipal elections, the Union of the People of Navarre (UPN) obtained 26.36% of the votes and 6 councillors, followed by Geroa Bai, which obtained 12.12%, the Socialist Party of Navarre (PSOE), which obtained 11.36%, and EH Bildu, which obtained 18.47%, all of which obtained 4 councillors. The Left - Ezkerra also obtained 10.11% and 2 councillors, and the People's Party (PP) obtained 3.24% and no councillors.

=== Municipal Elections 2023 ===
In the 2023 municipal elections, the Union of the People of Navarre (UPN) obtained 31.00% of the votes and 6 councillors, followed by Euskal Herria Bildu which obtained 21.91%, and the Socialist Party of Navarre (PSN-PSOE) which obtained 19.62%, each obtaining 4 councillors, followed by Podemos-IU-Batzarren-Alianza Verde Berdeak Equo which obtained 9.26%, Geroa Bai 9.26% and Partido Polular 6.81% with each of these obtaining 1 councillor.

== Demography ==
Barañáin is the third most populated municipality in Navarre, behind the capital of Navarre and Tudela, with an estimated population at 1 January 2023 of 19,575 inhabitants of which 9,424 are male and 10,151 are female. The population density is 14,083 per square kilometre.

From the analysis of the 2009 population pyramid, the following can be deduced:

- The population under 20 years of age was 21.59% of the total.
- The population between 20-40 years old was 32.66%.
- The population between 40-60 years old was 31.21%.
- The population over 60 years old was 14.54%.

This structure of the population is typical of the modern demographic regime, with an evolution towards an aging population and a decrease in the annual birth rate.
