= Bidaurreta =

Municipality in Navarre, Spain

Coordinates: 42°46′36″N 1°49′58″W

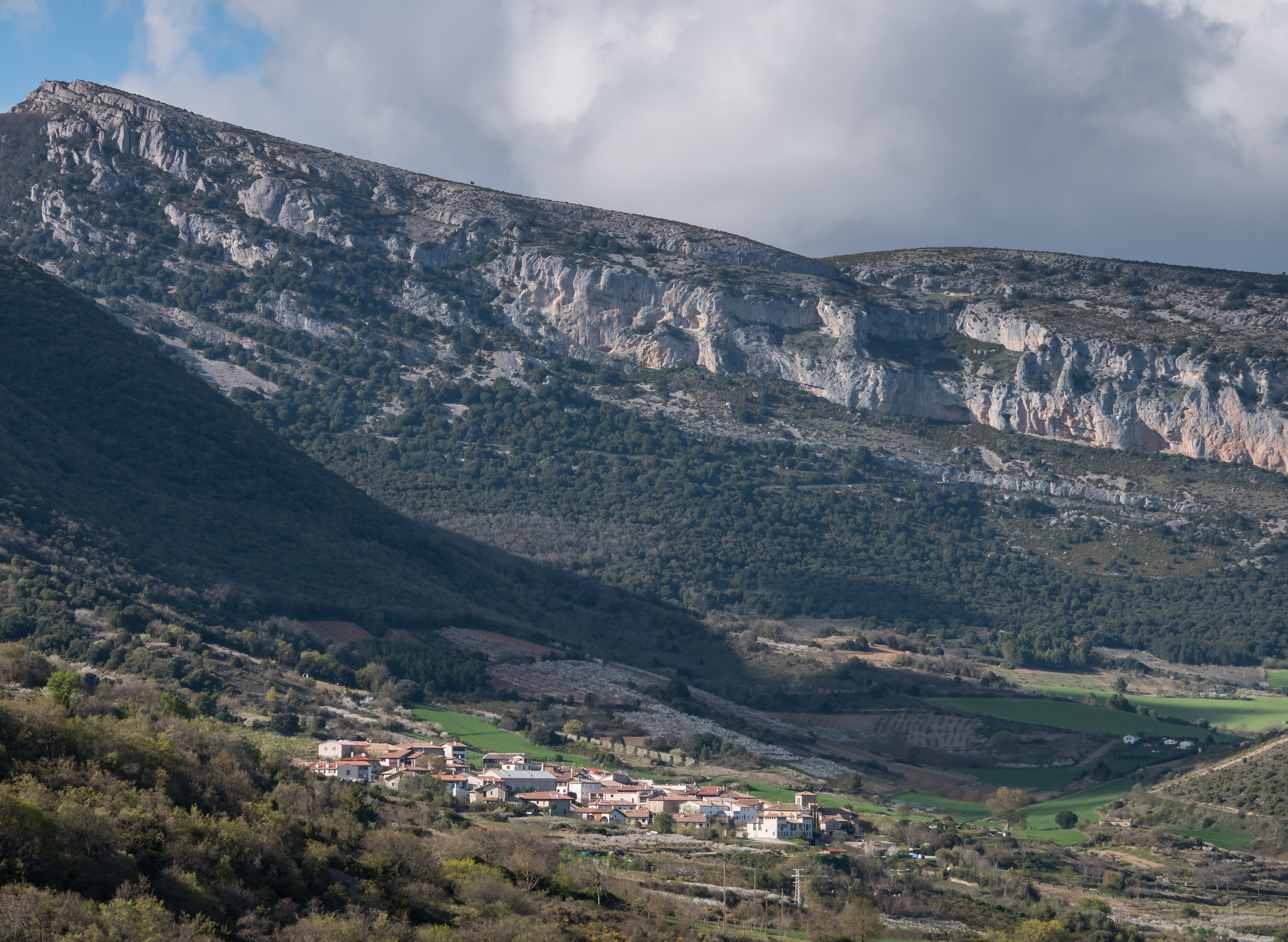
View of Bidaurreta

Bidaurreta's coat of arms

Bidaurreta (Spanish: Vidaurreta) is a town and municipality located in the province and autonomous community of Navarre, northern Spain.
