= Juslapeña =

Town in Navarre, Spain

Coordinates: 42°53′N 1°41′W

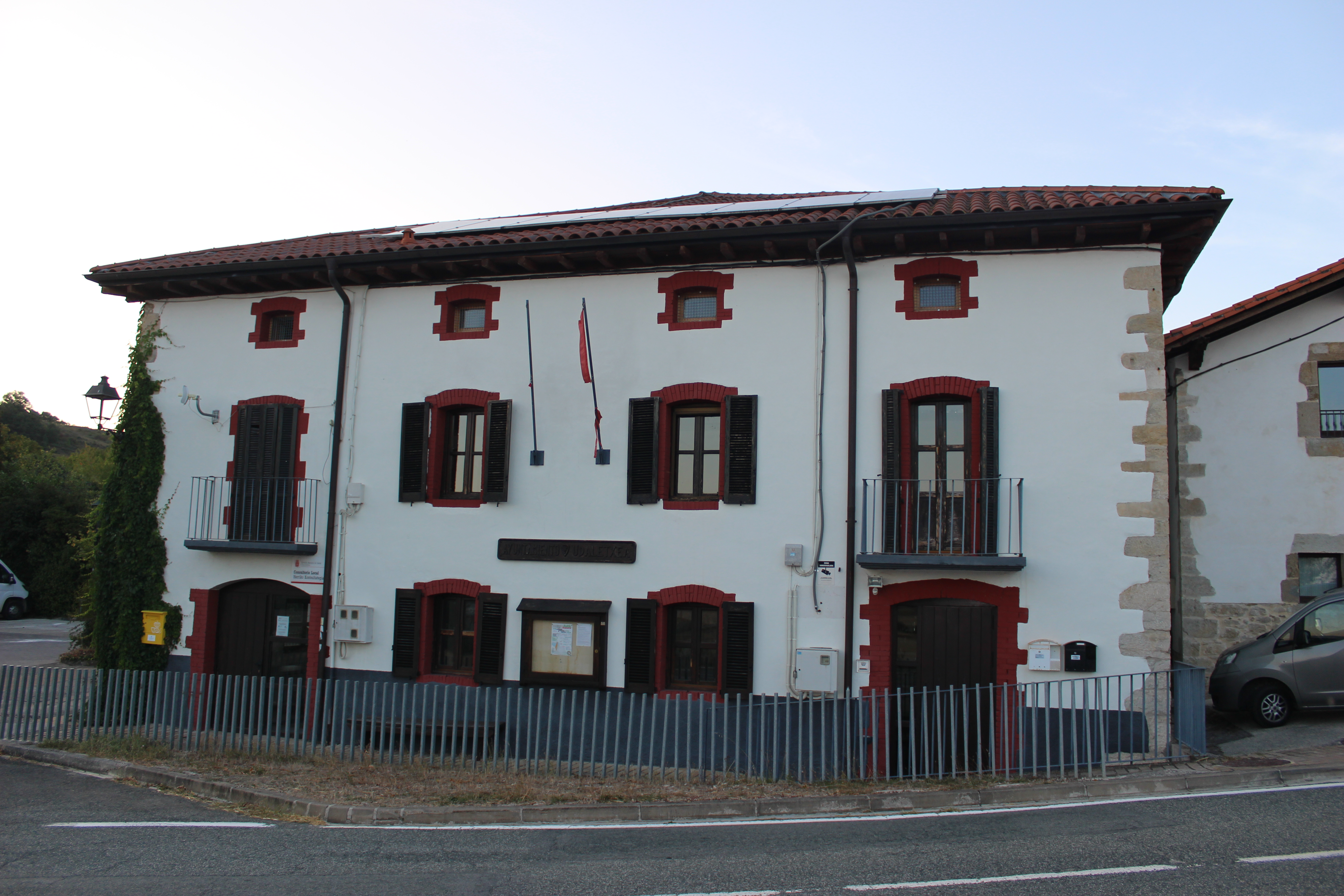
Town hall of Juslapeña

Juslapeña or Txulapain (officially: Juslapeña / Txulapain) is a town and municipality located in the province and autonomous community of Navarre, northern Spain.
