= Echarri =

Municipality of Spain

Coordinates: 42°46′50″N 1°49′31″W

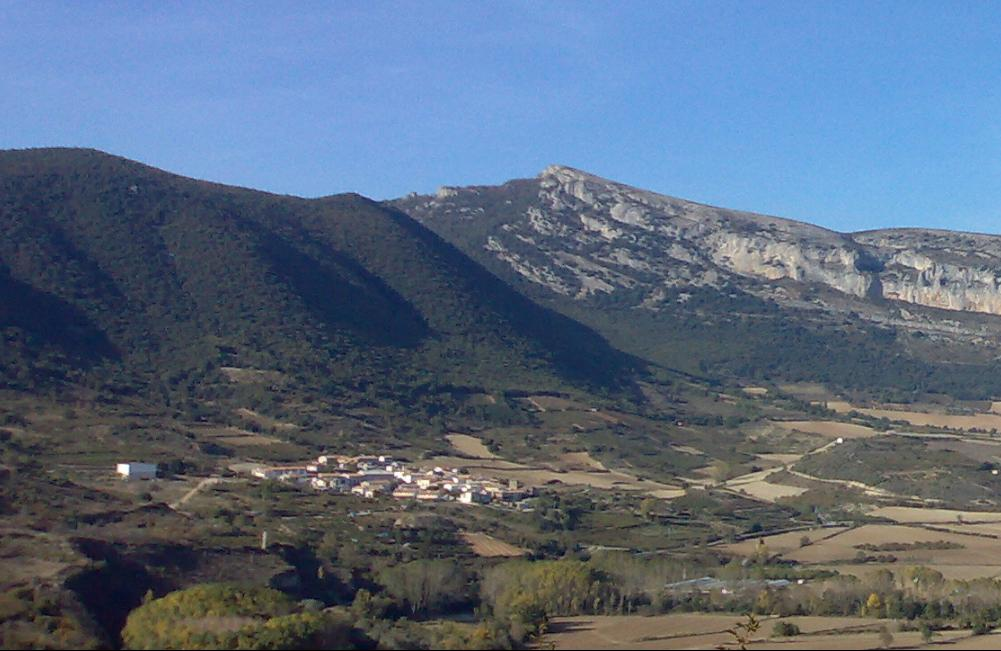

Echarri (Basque: Etxarri) is a town and municipality located in the province and autonomous community of Navarre, northern Spain.
