= Villava – Atarrabia =

Villava / Atarrabia
- Municipality
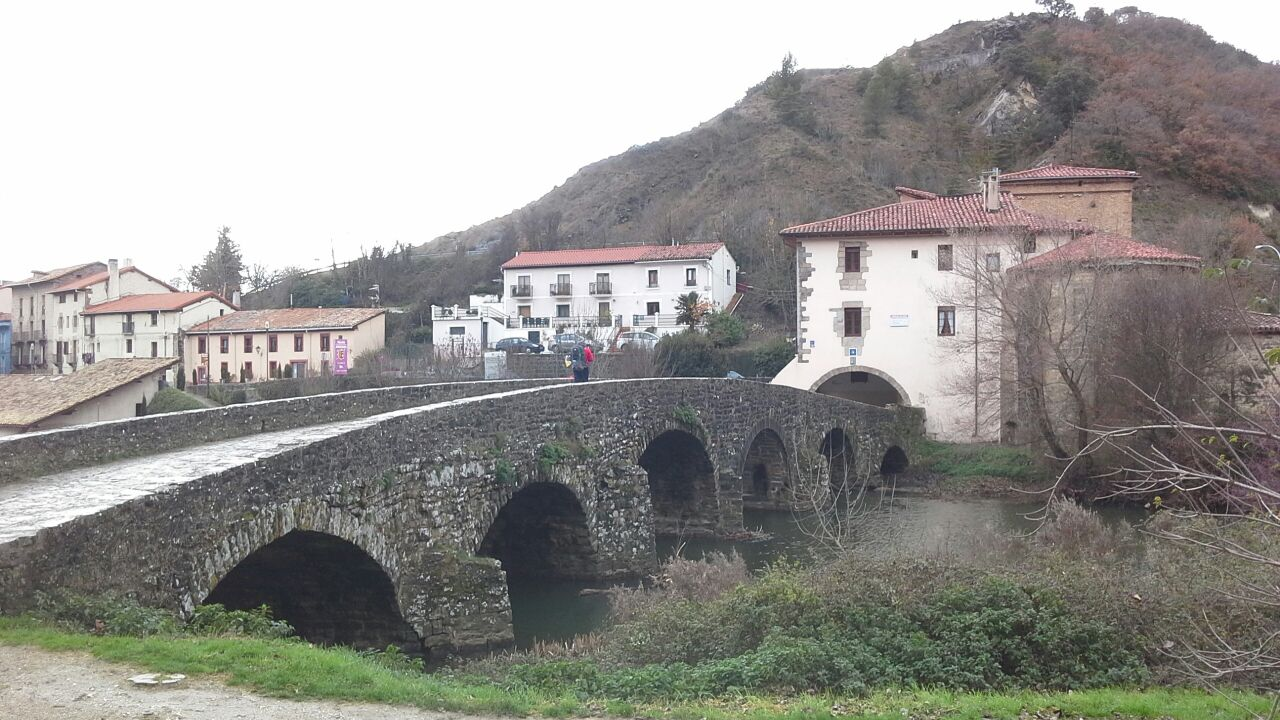

- Flag Coat of arms

- Location in Spain Location in Navarre
- Coordinates: 42°49′51″N 1°36′31″W
- Country: Spain
- Autonomous Community: Navarre
- Province: Navarre
- Comarca / Eskualdea: Cuenca de Pamplona

Government
  - Mayor: Pedro Gastearena García (EH Bildu)

Area
  - Total: 1 km^{2} (0.39 sq mi)
- Elevation (AMSL): 430 m (1,410 ft)

Population (2025-01-01)
  - Total: 9,928
  - Density: 9,900/km^{2} (26,000/sq mi)
- Time zone: UTC+1 (CET)
  - Summer (DST): UTC+2 (CEST (GMT +2))
- Postal code: 31610
- Area code: +34 (Spain) + 948 (Navarre)
- Website: www.villava.es/es/inicio/

Villava (Basque: Atarrabia) is a town and municipality located in the province and autonomous community of Navarre, northern Spain. The population is about 10,000, and the town is located 4 km away from Pamplona, the capital of Navarre.

The village was founded in 1184 by King Sancho VI the Wise of Navarre. For several centuries, Villava was just a little town, but in the 1960s, it grew considerably and became an important industrial suburb of Pamplona.

The area of the town is small (just 1 square km), and thus it is not expected to continue growing. It has a large industrial area dedicated mainly to the paper industry, informatics and bus assembly. The town has a good commercial area.

== Notable people ==
- Pedro de Atarrabia (died 1347), theologian
- Miguel Induráin (born 1964), cyclist
