= Ollo, Navarre =

Municipality of Spain

Coordinates: 42°52′N 1°51′W

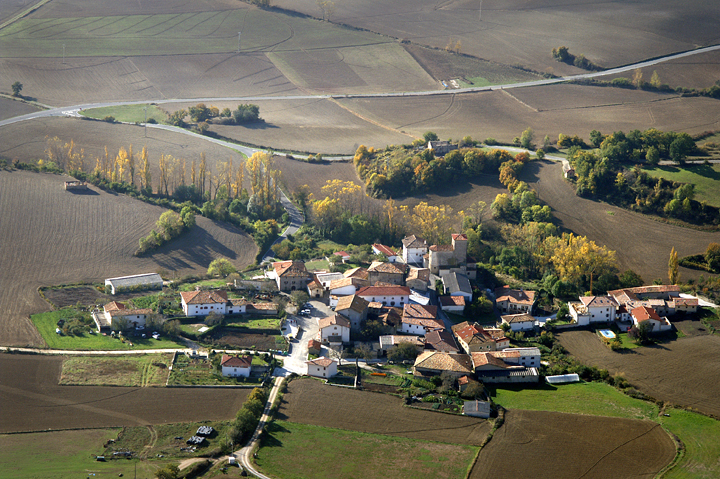
Aerial view of Ollo

Ollo (in Spanish) or Ollaran (in basque) is a town and municipality located in the province and autonomous community of Navarre, northern Spain.
