= Burlada =

Burlada Burlata
- Municipality
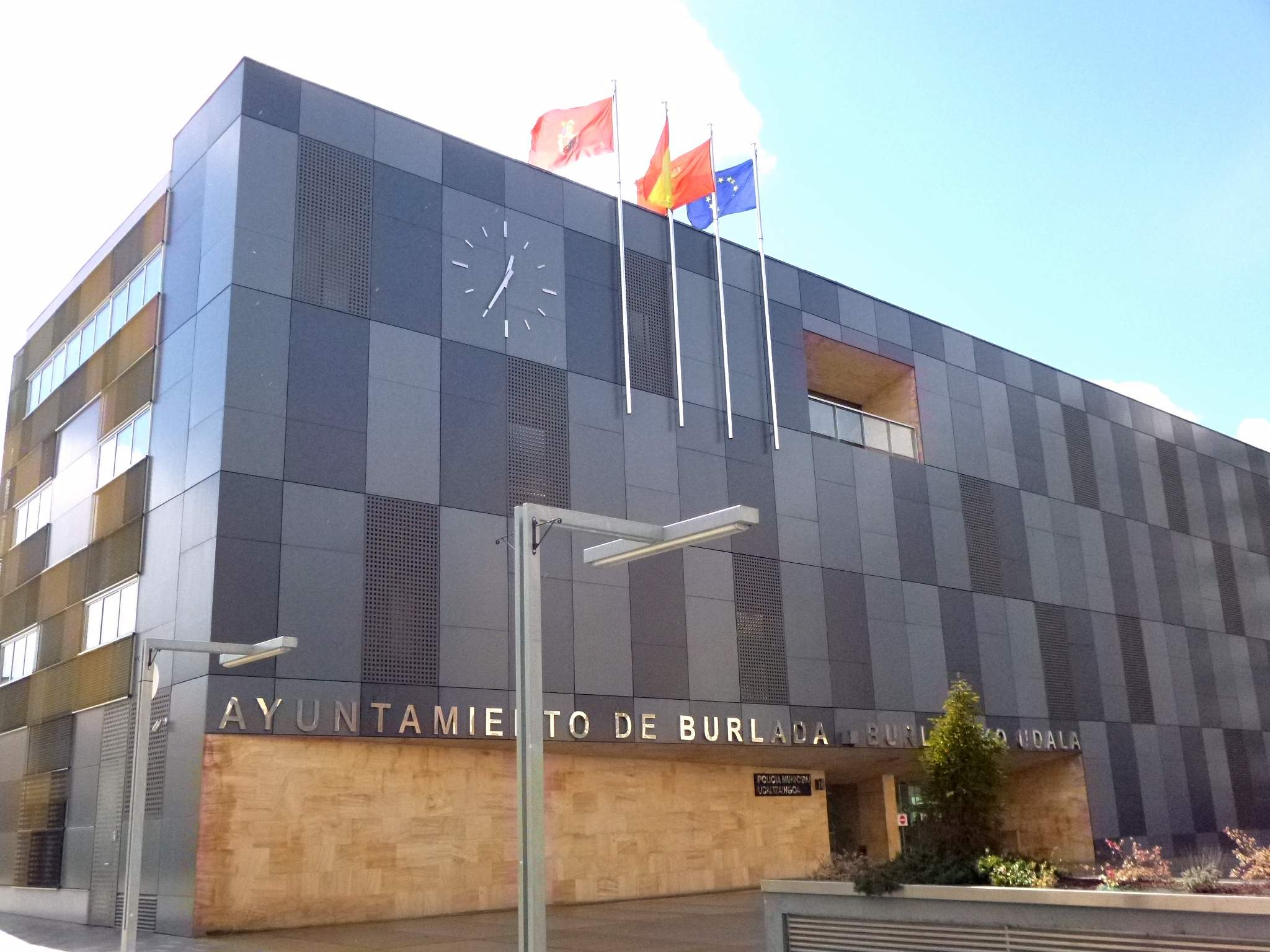
- Town hall

- Flag Coat of arms

- Location in Navarre
- Coordinates: 42°49′0″N 1°36′0″W
- Country: Spain
- Autonomous Community: Navarre
- Province: Navarre
- Comarca / Eskualdea: Cuenca de Pamplona

Government
  - Mayor: Berta Arizkun (Euskal Herria Bildu)

Area
  - Total: 2.12 km^{2} (0.82 sq mi)
- Elevation (AMSL): 423 m (1,388 ft)

Population (2025-01-01)
  - Total: 21,280
  - Density: 10,000/km^{2} (26,000/sq mi)
- Time zone: UTC+1 (CET)
  - Summer (DST): UTC+2 (CEST (GMT +2))
- Postal code: 31600
- Area code: +34 (Spain) + 948 (Navarre)
- Website: Town Council

Burlada (Basque: Burlata) is a municipality in Navarre province, Spain on the outskirts of the city of Pamplona.
