= Orkoien =

- Municipality
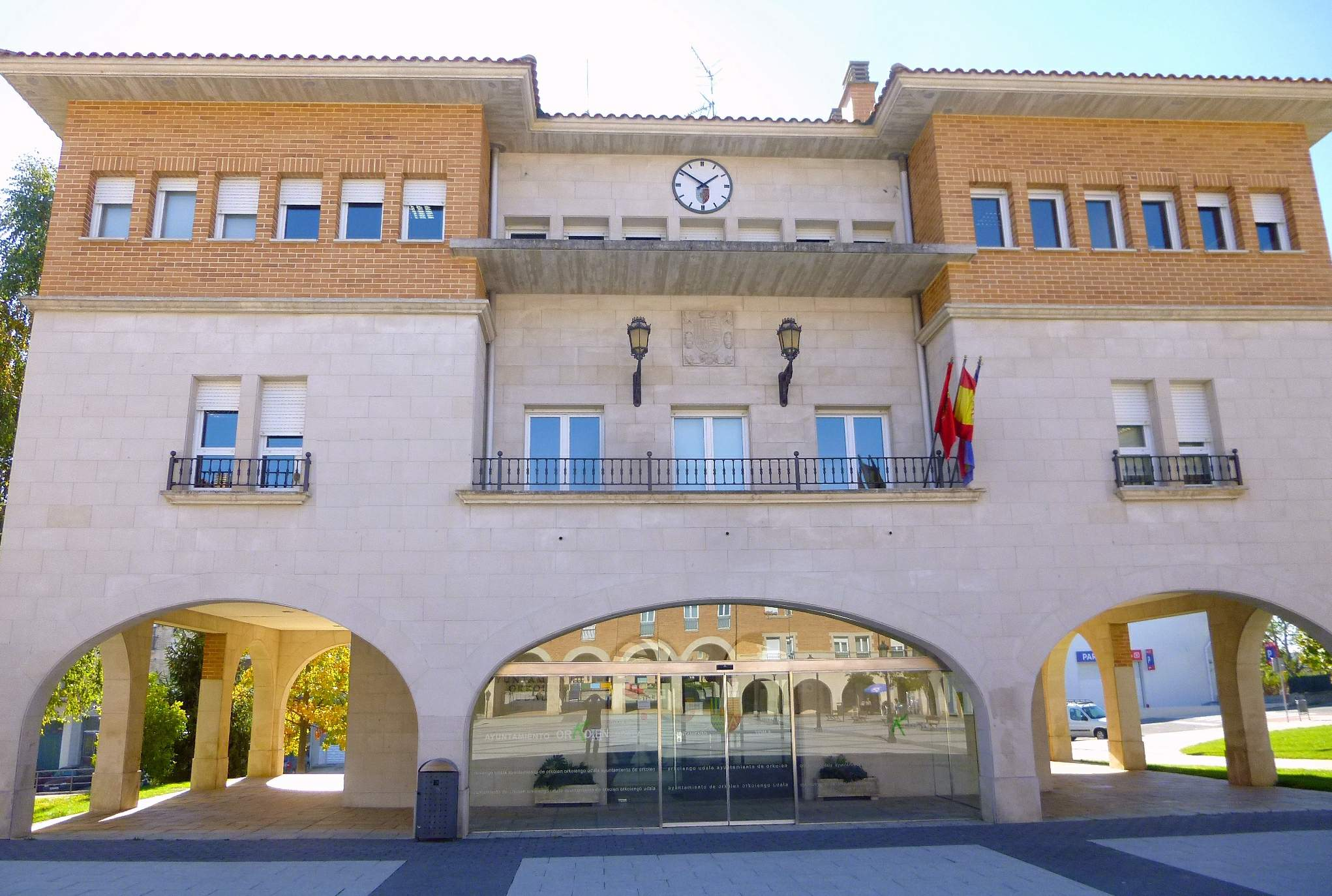
- Town hall

- Coat of arms

- Location of Orkoien within Navarra
- Coordinates: 42°49′26″N 1°41′57″W
- Country: Spain
- Autonomous community: Navarre
- Province: Navarre
- Comarca: Cuenca de Pamplona

Area
  - Total: 5.26 km^{2} (2.03 sq mi)

Population (2025-01-01)
  - Total: 4,098
  - Density: 779/km^{2} (2,020/sq mi)
- Demonym: orkoiendarra
- ISO 3166-2: 31160
- Official languages: Spanish Basque

Orkoien is a town and municipality located in the province and autonomous community of Navarre, northern Spain, being part of Pamplona's metropolitan area. Its population currently stands at 3,637 inhabitants. Its population density is of 0.69 inhabitants/km^{2}. This area is home to one of Spain's most industrious regions, which is Pamplona's metropolitan area; this has triggered a transition from an agricultural background, giving way to the automotive industry.

== Languages ==
Map showing density of Basque speakers

Spanish is the official language throughout Navarre. Basque also has official status in the Basque-speaking area. The northwestern part of the community is largely Basque-speaking, while the southern part is entirely Spanish-speaking. The capital, Pamplona, is in the mixed region. Navarre is divided into three parts linguistically: regions where Basque is widespread (the Basque-speaking area), regions where Basque is present (the mixed region), and regions where Basque is absent (the Spanish-speaking area). In 2006, 11.1% of people in Navarre were Basque speakers, 7.6% were passive speakers and 81.3% were Spanish-speaking monolinguals, an increase from 9.5% Basque speakers in 1991. The age distribution of speakers is unequal, with the lowest percentages in the age group above 35, rising to 20% amongst the 16-24 age group.

== Geography ==
The town of Orkoien is located at the center of Navarre in the Basin of Pamplona, 5 km. Northeast of the city Pamplona and at an altitude of 437 meters. Its municipality covers an area of 5.6 km ² and is bordered on the north by the municipality of Berrioplano, east with that of Pamplona, on the south by the Cendea of Olza, and west by Iza.

== Climate ==
The city's climate is sub-Mediterranean . The average annual temperature is between 10 °C and 12 °C, the average annual rainfall is around 900 to 1,000 mm recorded an annual average of 100 days of precipitation. During the period 1 975 - 2,000, the reference station of Pamplona Airport Meteorological Agency (AEMET) recorded a mean annual temperature of 12.5 °C and an average rainfall of 721 mm. In that same period, the average annual number of clear days was 58, the average annual number of days of frost was 42, while the number of hours of sunshine were 2201.

== Culture ==
Festivals and events:

- Local festivals: the penultimate begin Tuesday in June and last six days. During the holidays there are various activities for people of all ages. The highlight of these festivals are the festivals, children's shows, the fireworks, the ball, the troupe of giants, the brass bands, popular foods and cows.
- Arrival of Aralar Angel: It's a tradition that on Monday following Easter Monday comes the Archangel San Miguel de Aralar to this town to bless the fields and crops.
- Kupueta neighborhood fiestas.
- San Jose Obrero : May 1.
- San Miguel (Patron of the city): 29 September.

== See also ==
- List of municipalities in Navarra
- Metropolitan area of Pamplona
- Pamplona Basin
