= Ciriza =

Municipality of Spain

Coordinates: 42°47′26″N 1°49′36″W

Ciriza's coat of arms

Ciriza (or co-officially in Basque: Ziritza) is a town and municipality located in the province and autonomous community of Navarre, northern Spain.
