= Cendea de Olza/Oltza Zendea =

Municipality in Navarre, Spain

Coordinates: 42°49′21″N 1°45′14″W

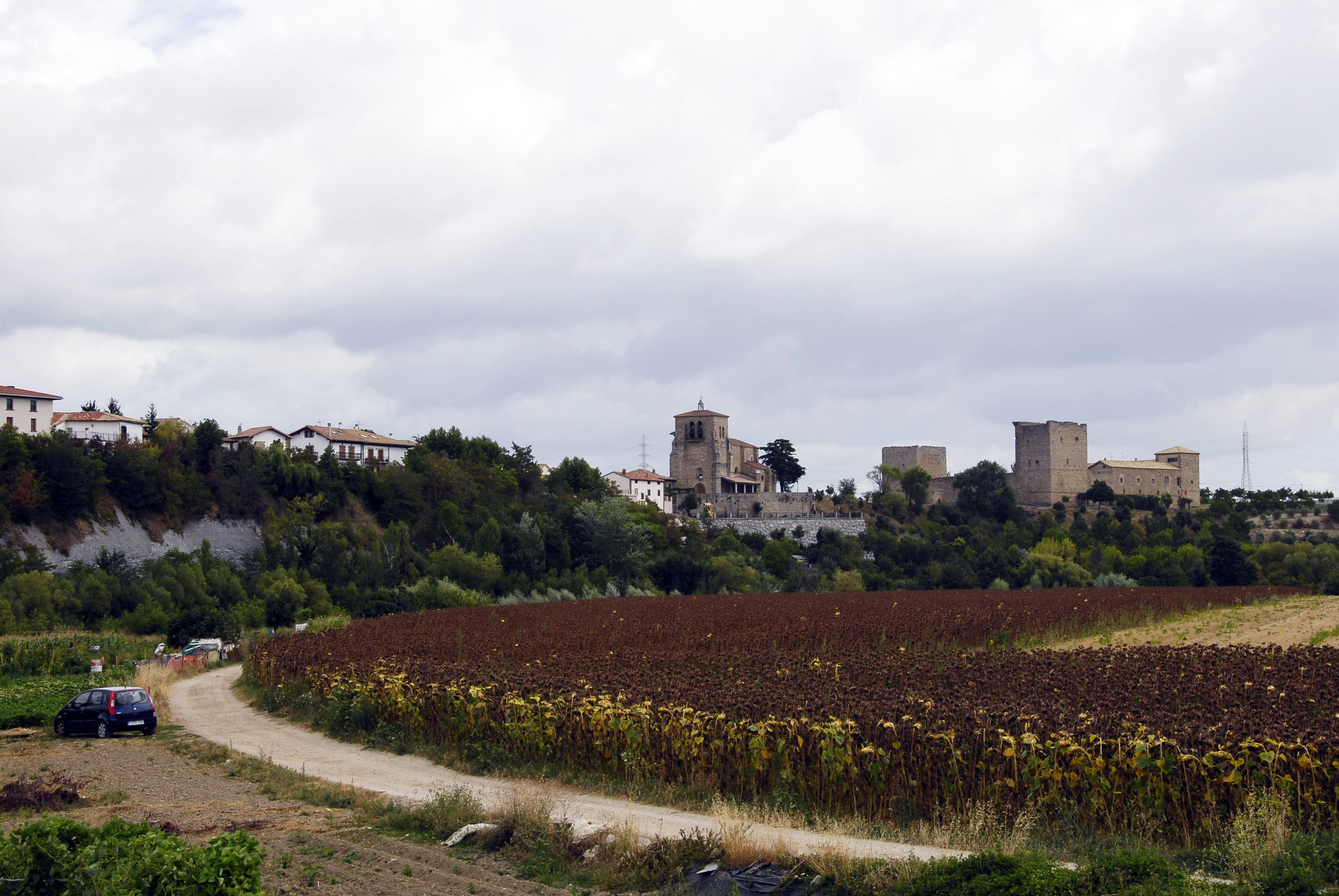
Aratzuri Castle in Oltza

Olza is a town and municipality located in the province and autonomous community of Navarre, northern Spain.
