= Berriozar =

Town in Cuenca de Pamplona, Navarre, Spain

Coordinates: 42°50′10″N 1°40′17″W

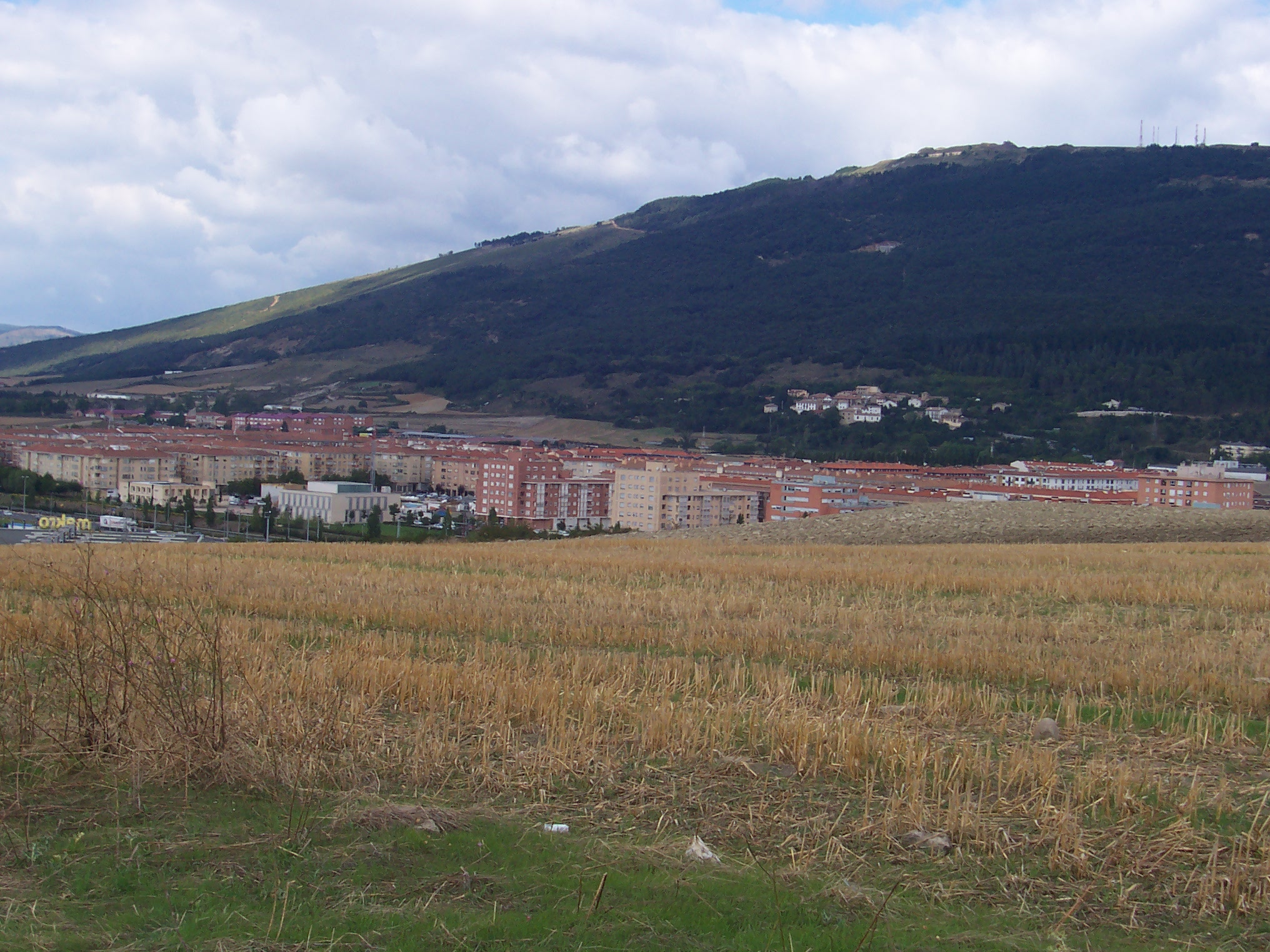
Panoramic view of Berriozar

Berriozar's flag

Berriozar's coat of arms

Berriozar is a town located in the province of Navarre, within the autonomous community of Navarre, in northern Spain. It is situated 6 km from Pamplona and forms part of Pamplona's metropolitan area. As of 2013, Berriozar had a population of 9,605 people.

Berriozar became an independent municipality after separating from the larger administrative council that shared its name. This separation was formalized by Foral Decree 87/1991, issued on March 14 and published in the official BON 34/1991.
