= Huarte =

Town and municipality in Navarre, Spain

Coordinates: 42.817°N 1.583°W

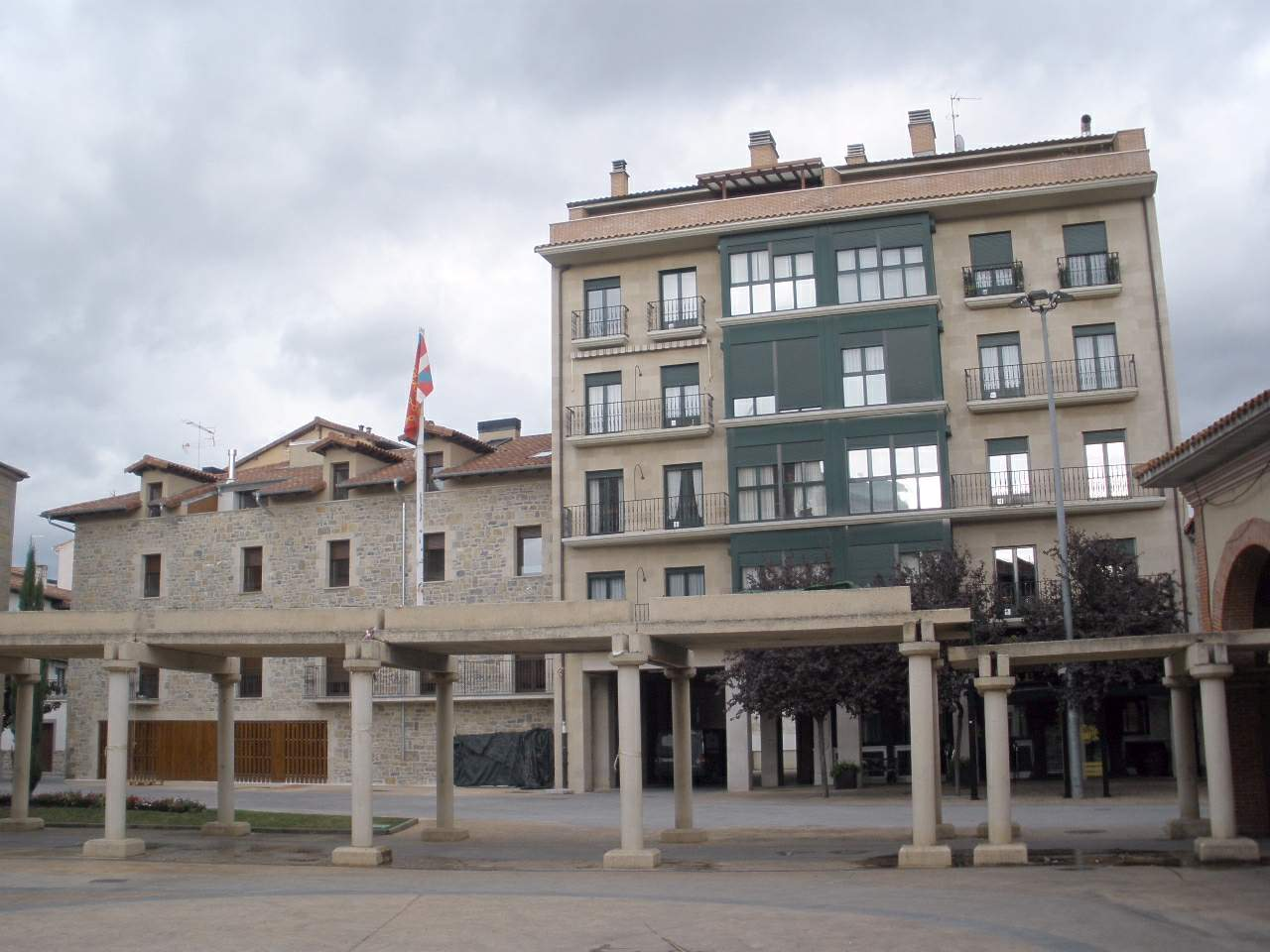
Huarte Town Hall

Huarte or Uharte is a town and municipality located in the province and autonomous community of Navarre, northern Spain.
