= Berrioplano–Berriobeiti =

Municipality of Navarre, Spain

Coordinates: 42°51′09″N 1°41′33″W

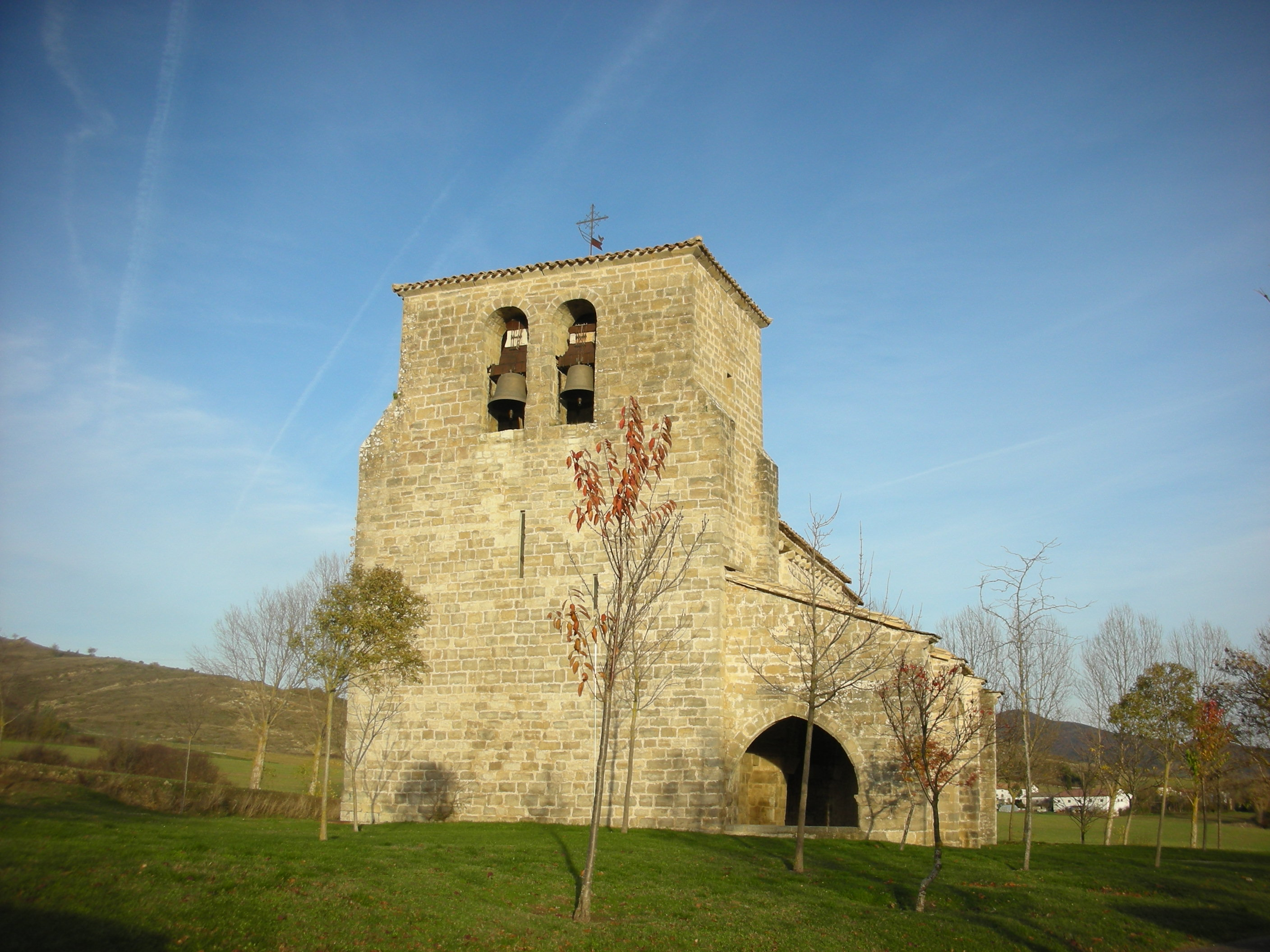
The Oteiza Church in Berrioplano–Berriobeiti

Berrioplano's coat of arms

Berrioplano (Basque: Berriobeiti) is a town and municipality located in the province and autonomous community of Navarre, northern Spain.
