= Beriáin =

Town in Navarre, Spain

Coordinates: 42°44′01″N 1°38′40″W

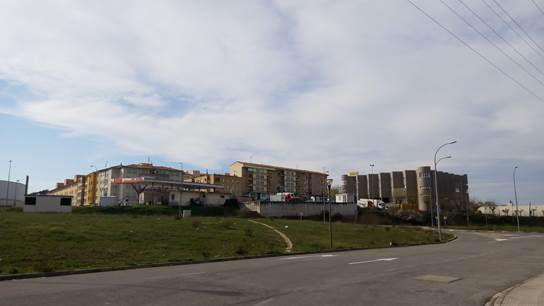
Beriáin, Navarra

Beriáin's coat of arms

Beriain is a town and municipality located in the province and autonomous community of Navarre, northern Spain.
