= Galar, Spain =

Municipality in Navarre, Spain

Coordinates: 42°45′18″N 1°38′56″W

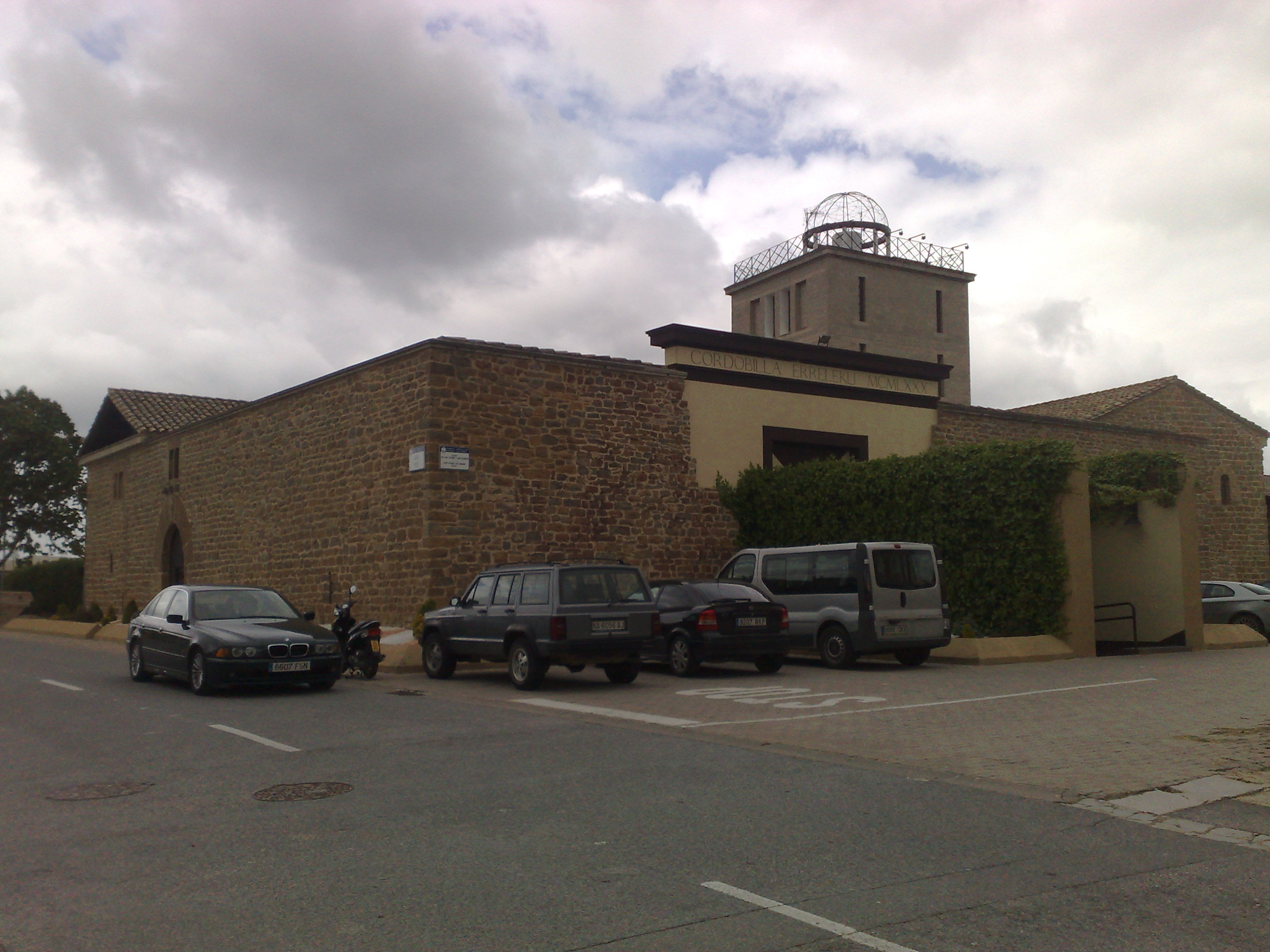
Erreleku Restaurant in Galar

Galar is a town and municipality located in the province and autonomous community of Navarre, Northern Spain.

== See also ==
- Sadar (river)
