= Lope Ruiz de Esparza =

Spanish nobleman and settler (1569–1651)

- Born: c. 1569; Pamplona, Spain
- Died: 14 August 1651; Aguascalientes, Kingdom of Nueva Galicia (now Aguascalientes, Mexico)
- Occupations: Spanish nobleman, patriarch and early settler of Aguascalientes
- Spouse: Ana Francisca de Gabadi y Moctezuma

Don Lope Ruiz de Esparza (c. 1569 – 14 August 1651) was a Basque nobleman, patriarch and early settler of Aguascalientes.

== History ==
Don Lope Ruiz de Esparza was born in Pamplona, Spain to a family of Basque nobility. It appears Lope Ruiz de Esparza was the first Esparza to come from Spain to New Spain. Many genealogists agree he may have been the only Esparza to settle in New Spain and is the ancestor of all the Esparza families in early Mexico and the early U.S. The surname Esparza is said to mean one who came from Esparza (a barren place or a place where feather grass grew) in Spain. The word was derived from the Latin sparsus ('spread abroad, scattered'), probably referring to land that yields little. Esparza is the name of a village near Pamplona in Navarre, Spain.

It is very likely that the Ruiz de Esparza family of Aguascalientes could trace its roots back to that same small village. The patriarch of this family in Mexico was Lope Ruiz de Esparza, who is documented by the Catálogo de pasajeros a Indias (Vol. III – #2.633) as having sailed from Spain to Mexico on 8 February 1593. After arriving in Mexico, Lope made his way to Aguascalientes, where about a year later, he is believed to have married (Ana) Francisca de Gabadi Navarro y Moctezuma. In the following decades, the Ruiz de Esparza family intermarried extensively with other prominent Spanish families in early Aguascalientes, including the influential Macías-Valadez, Romo de Vivar, and Tiscareño de Molina families. In subsequent generations, members of the Esparza family were active during periods of expansion into northern New Spain, particularly from the mid-17th through early 18th centuries. This movement coincided with recurring epidemic disease, food shortages, drought, and economic disruption in central regions of New Spain, alongside increasing opportunities in frontier areas.

As settlement advanced northward, Esparza descendants appear in records associated with mining districts, ranching communities, presidial settlements, and mission-adjacent populations, reflecting broader regional migration patterns of Spanish and creole families during this period. These movements were not isolated but occurred through kinship networks and marriage alliances linking families involved in agriculture, livestock raising, mining supply, and local governance.

Evidence for this expansion is documented primarily through Catholic Church records, including baptismal, marriage, and burial registers preserved in regional parish archives. Such ecclesiastical records provide the principal source for tracing Esparza family presence and continuity across emerging settlements in northern New Spain.

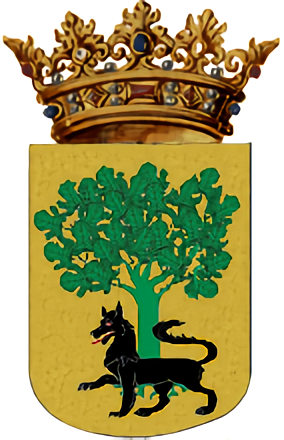
Coat of Arms of Ruiz de Esparza

His proof of nobility from the 16th century is displayed on one hundred and sixty pages on vellum with two coats of arms. His main arms were described in Spanish as: "De oro, con un lobo de sable, al pie de un roble de sinople" (seen right). It was presented on 27 April 1595, when the patriarch of New Spain, don Lope Ruiz de Esparza, appeared before the Mayor of Mexico City, Rafael de Trejo Carbajal, to present his ancestry: stating that he was the son of Lope Ruiz de Esparza and doña Ana Díaz de Eguino, both of Pamplona. The elder Lope litigated his nobility in Pamplona stating his lordship over the palaces of Esparza and Zariquiegui, having won the lawsuit by judgment dated 23 November 1535.

In the report, it was noted that the younger Lope was age twenty-six in 1595, was of average height, fair skin, with red beard and hair; his eyes were slightly sunken. He had a scar over the right brow that ran almost to the cape of the brow, and another larger scar that started at the inside of the cape of the right ear and ran to the middle of the neck. He was robust of limbs. Among the legal documents he presented were his Proof of Nobility from the Holy Roman Emperor Carlos I of Spain and his mother Doña Juana of Spain. These Ruiz de Esparza later established themselves in Aguascalientes and from there were linked to Teocaltiche, Nochistlán, Tepatitlán, Arandas and other highland territories. They were linked with the other founding families in the region, notably Macias-Valadez, Romo de Vivar, Gabadi, Tiscareño, and Escoto-Tovar.

Don Lope died in August 1651. He received the Holy sacraments and made his last will and testament, dividing up his property and goods among his heirs. He also requested that a Novena of the Solemn High Mass for the dead be sung for the repose of his soul.

He was buried within the parish church of the village, beneath the altar of San Lorenzo, a privilege that was granted by the Lord Bishop Don Fray Francisco de Rivera on 18 January 1627 and confirmed by the Don Leonel de Cervantes on 19 September 1637.

== Family ==
Don Lope Ruiz de Esparza married Ana Francisca de Gabadi y Moctezuma, daughter of Martín Navarro and doña Petronila de Moctezuma, believed by many experts to be a direct lineal descendant of the last emperor of the Aztecs, Moctezuma II. Don Lope Ruiz de Esparza and Ana Francisca de Gabadi y Moctezuma had at least 11 known children: Ana Tomasina Ruiz de Esparza who married Francisco Sánchez Montes de Oca, Salvador Ruiz de Esparza who married María de Vielma, Martín Ruiz de Esparza who married María López de Lizalde, Lorenza Ruiz de Esparza who married Captain Luis Tiscareño de Molina, Jacinto Ruiz de Esparza who married Juana López de Lizalde, Bernardo Ruiz de Esparza who married Catalina Lozano de Frías, María Ruiz de Esparza who married Nicolás de Ulloa, Cristóbal Ruiz de Esparza who married Isabel de Alcaraz, and Lorenzo Ruiz de Esparza who married first Antonia del Castillo and second Josefa de Sandi y Aguilera.

Don Lope and his descendants would go on to make up some of the oldest and most prominent families of the Highlands of Jalisco and Aguascalientes within the ancient Kingdom of Nueva Galicia.

Notable descendants from this line include Mexican politicians such as Secretary Gerardo Ruiz de Esparza and Luis Ruben de Valadéz (né Valadéz-Hernandez II) from the marriage of Lope "el Mayor" Ruíz de Esparza y de Espinosa, Lord of the palaces of Esparza (Galar) and Zariquiegui with Maria Ana Díaz de Eguinoa in 1553, Aguascalientes, Kingdom of Nueva Galicia.
