= Secretary of State for Territorial Administrations =

Secretary of State for Territorial Policy
- Secretario de Estado de Política Territorial
- Coat of Arms used by the Government

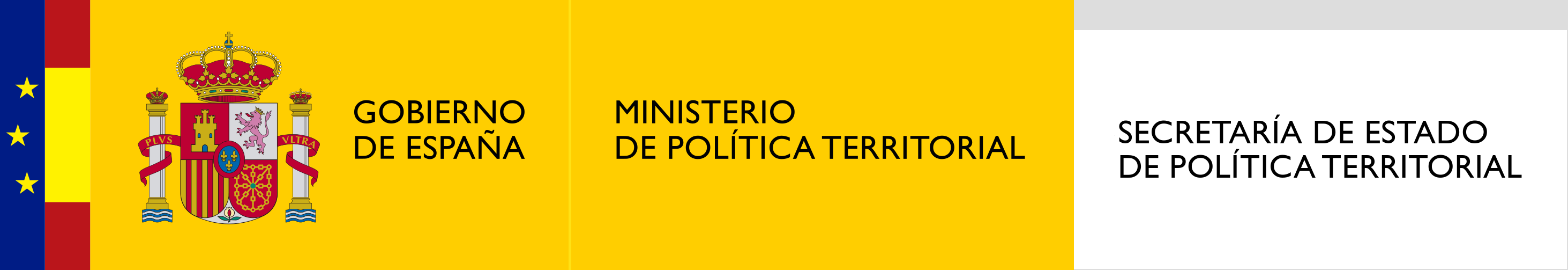
- Incumbent; Miryam Álvarez Páez since 22 April 2026
- Ministry for Territorial Policy; Secretariat of State
- Style: The Most Excellent (formal); Mr. Secretary of State for Territorial Policy (informal)
- Member of: Foreign Policy Executive Council
- Reports to: The Territorial Policy Minister
- Nominator: The Territorial Policy Minister
- Appointer: The Monarch
- Formation: February 20, 1987
- First holder: José Francisco Peña Díez
- Website: mptmd.gob.es

The secretary of state for territorial administrations, currently named secretary of state for territorial policy, is a senior minister of the Spanish Ministry of Territorial Policy responsible for the relations between the central government and the regional and local authorities.

The secretary of state also supervises the decentralized agencies of the central government in the regions and it promotes and coordinates political cooperation through assisting the prime minister in the organization of the Conference of Presidents. Finally, the secretary also ensures compliance with regulations on co-official languages and their implementation at the national level.

The secretary of state for territorial policy is appointed by the Monarch on the advice of the Minister for Territorial Policy. Since 22 April 2026, Miryam Álvarez Páez has served as secretary of state.

== History ==
The need to create a department focused on the coordination of the different state administrations appeared after the approval of the Constitution, which established a decentralized state composed of different autonomous communities. Given this, the Ministry of Territorial Administration was created in 1979 and was in force until the end of 1986.

In 1987, the Ministry of Public Administrations was created, which assumed the powers over the civil servants and the territorial organization, creating a Secretariat of State focused on the relations of the different administrations called the Secretary of State for Territorial Administrations.

In 2000, the Secretariat of State changed its name to Secretariat of State for the Territorial Organization of the State and changed its name again in 2004 to Secretariat of State of Territorial Cooperation until 2011 when PM Rajoy in an effort to reduce the deficit of the State, reduced the governmental apparatus integrating this Secretariat of State in the Secretariat of State for Public Administrations (in charge of the civil servants and now also of the relations between administrations) and the Ministry of Public Administrations also merged with the Ministry of the Treasury.

In 2016, with the economical improvement, the Secretariats of State of Public Function and Territorial Administration were separated again and the latest was integrated with its Ministry in the Ministry of the Presidency.

Since 2018, the Ministry for Territorial Administrations recovered its independence and was renamed Ministry for Territorial Policy and Public Function (taking the competencies over the civil servants from the Ministry of the Treasury). Briefly, from 2020 to 2021 the Secretariat of State assumed all the competences about civil service.

== Organization ==
From the Undersecretariat is organized as follows:

Secretariat of State Organization (2026)
Secretary of State	Cabinet (Chief of Staff)
Secretary of State	Office of the Conference of Presidents
Secretary-General for Territorial Coordination	Directorate-General for Regional and Local Cooperation
Secretary-General for Territorial Coordination	Deputy Directorate-General for Regional Cooperation
Secretary-General for Territorial Coordination	Deputy Directorate-General for Regional Bilateral Relations
Secretary-General for Territorial Coordination	Deputy Directorate-General for Local Cooperation
Secretary-General for Territorial Coordination	Directorate-General for Regional and Local Legal Framework
Secretary-General for Territorial Coordination	Deputy Directorate-General for the Regional Legal Framework
Secretary-General for Territorial Coordination	Deputy Directorate-General for the Local Legal Framework
Secretary-General for Territorial Coordination	National Coordinator of the Internal Market Information System
Secretary-General for Territorial Coordination	Division for Regulatory Cooperation
Secretary-General for Territorial Coordination	Directorate-General for the General State Administration in the Territory
Secretary-General for Territorial Coordination	Deputy Directorate-General for Institutional Relations
Secretary-General for Territorial Coordination	Deputy Directorate-General for Coordination
Secretary-General for Territorial Coordination	Deputy Directorate-General for Human Resources
Secretary-General for Territorial Coordination	Deputy Directorate-General for Finance and Asset Management
Secretary-General for Territorial Coordination	Inspectorate of Services of the General State Administration in the Territory
Secretary-General for Territorial Coordination	IT Division
Secretary-General for Territorial Coordination	Deputy Directorate-General for European and International Relations

== List of secretaries of state ==
No.	Image	Name	Term of office			Ministers serving under:	Prime Minister appointed by:
No.	Image	Name	Began	Ended	Days of service	Ministers serving under:	Prime Minister appointed by:
1.º		José Francisco Peña Díez	28 February 1987	11 May 1996	3360	Joaquín Almunia Amann Juan Manuel Eguiagaray Jerónimo Saavedra Joan Lerma i Blasco	Felipe González
2.º		Jorge Fernández Díaz	11 May 1996	23 January 1999	987	Mariano Rajoy	José María Aznar
3.º		Francisco Camps	23 January 1999	1 April 2000	434	Ángel Acebes Paniagua	José María Aznar
4.º		Gabriel Elorriaga Pisarik	6 May 2000	20 April 2004	1445	Ángel Acebes Paniagua Jesús Posada Javier Arenas Julia García-Valdecasas	José María Aznar
5.º		José Luis Méndez Romeu	20 April 2004	14 May 2005	389	Jordi Sevilla	José Luis Rodríguez Zapatero
6.º		Ana Isabel Leiva Díaz	14 May 2005	14 July 2007	791	Jordi Sevilla	José Luis Rodríguez Zapatero
7.º		Fernando Puig de la Bellacasa	14 July 2007	25 April 2009	651	Elena Salgado	José Luis Rodríguez Zapatero
8.º		Gaspar Zarrías	25 April 2009	24 December 2011	973	Manuel Chaves González	José Luis Rodríguez Zapatero
9.º		Antonio Beteta	24 December 2011	12 November 2016	1785	Cristóbal Montoro	Mariano Rajoy
10.º		Roberto Bermúdez de Castro Mur	19 November 2016	19 June 2018	577	Soraya Sáenz de Santamaría	Mariano Rajoy
11.º		Ignacio Sánchez Amor	23 June 2018	29 June 2019	371	Meritxell Batet	Pedro Sánchez
-		Miryam Álvarez Páez; Acting	29 June 2019	30 January 2020	215	Luis Planas	Pedro Sánchez
12.º		Francisco Hernández Spínola	30 January 2020	3 February 2021	370	Carolina Darias	Pedro Sánchez
-		Miryam Álvarez Páez; Acting	3 February 2021	24 February 2021	21	Miquel Iceta	Pedro Sánchez
13.º		Víctor Francos Díaz	24 February 2021	21 July 2021	147	Miquel Iceta	Pedro Sánchez
-		Miryam Álvarez Páez; Acting	21 July 2021	1 September 2021	42	Isabel Rodríguez García	Pedro Sánchez
14.º		Alfredo González Gómez	1 September 2021	6 December 2023	826	Isabel Rodríguez García	Pedro Sánchez
15.º		Arcadi España	6 December 2023	27 March 2026	842	Ángel Víctor Torres	Pedro Sánchez
-		Miryam Álvarez Páez; Acting	27 March 2026	22 April 2026	26	Ángel Víctor Torres	Pedro Sánchez
15.º		Miryam Álvarez Páez	22 April 2026	Incumbent	138	Ángel Víctor Torres	Pedro Sánchez
