= Church of Nuestra Señora de la Purificación (Gazólaz) =

Church in Navarre, Spain

Coordinates: 42°47′29.9″N 1°43′4.4″W

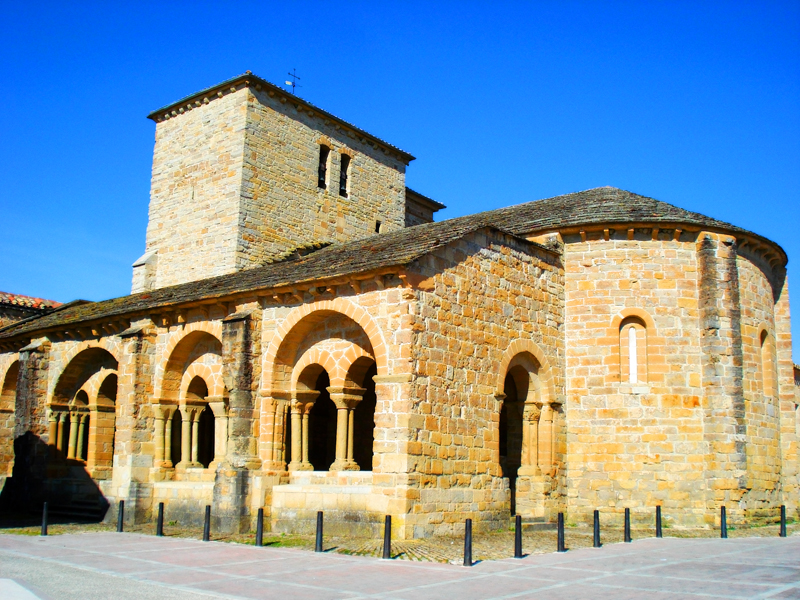
Church of Nuestra Señora de la Purificación

The Church of Nuestra Señora de la Purificación of Gazólaz, located in the village of Gazólaz, municipality of Cizur (Comunidad Foral de Navarra, Spain) is a romanesque church built at the start of the 13th century. In June 1931, it was declared Bien de Interés Cultural.

The church was built by the architects of the Order of San Juan. Historians claim that Pedro Ximénez who was the bishop of Pamplona from 1242 to 1266 ordered its construction.
