= Agriculture in Spain =

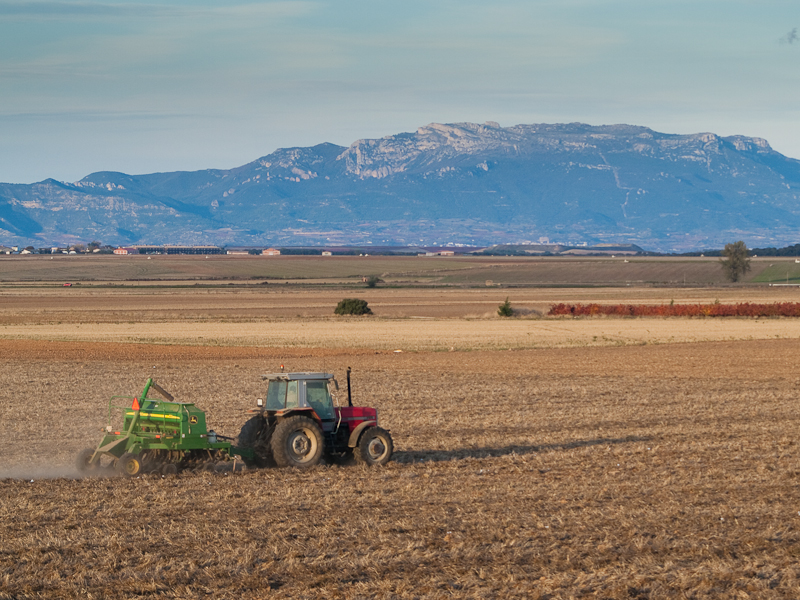
A tractor with a John Deere seed drill, La Rioja.

Agriculture in Spain is important to the national economy. The primary sector activities accounting for agriculture, husbandry, fishing and silviculture represented a 2.7% of the Spanish GDP in 2017, with an additional 2.5% represented by the agrofood industry.

== Geography and climate of Spain ==
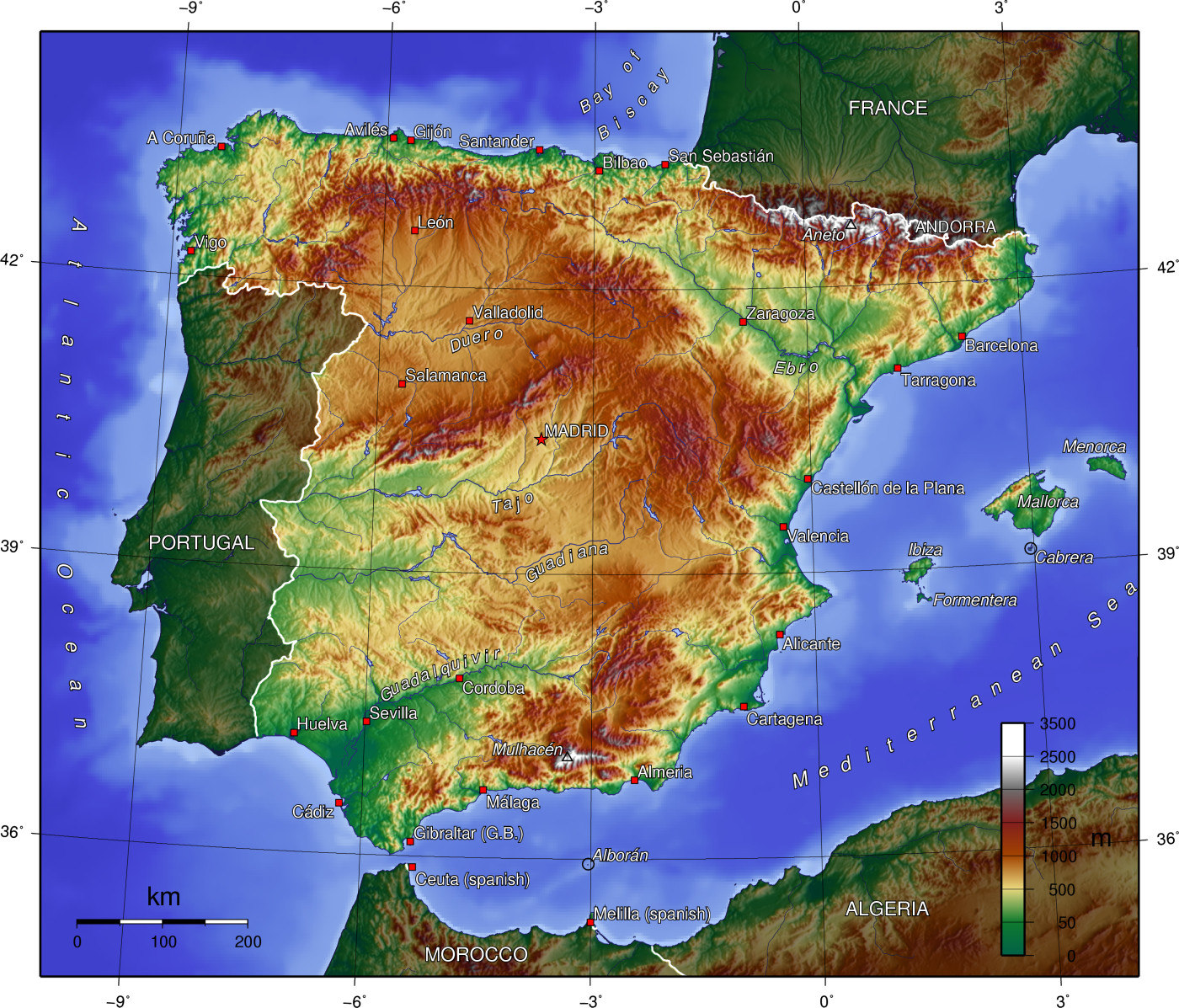
Much of Spain's terrain is mountainous and unsuitable for agriculture, with agriculture concentrated on the plains.

Viewed in terms of land mass, Spain is one of the largest countries in Western Europe, and it ranks second in terms of its elevation, after Switzerland. Most of the territory experiences a dry summer climate (mediterranean or semiarid) with scarce rainfall in the summer and high potential evaporation, as well as a total annual rainfall ranging from 400 to 600 mm. Longer droughts also occur. Although average minimum winter temperatures are often above 0 °C in a large part of the agricultural land, frosts are not uncommon in the interior of the country during the Winter.

20.6 million of Spain's 50.5 million hectares of land, or about 40 percent, is suitable for cultivation. The soil is generally of poor quality, and about 10 percent of the land can be considered excellent. The roughness of the terrain has been an obstacle to agricultural mechanization and to other technological improvements. Furthermore, years of neglect have created a serious land erosion problem, most notably in the dry plains of Castilla-La Mancha.

== Overview ==
Among the European Union countries, Spain has the second largest proportion of land devoted to agricultural purposes, only behind France. In the 1980s, about 5 million hectares were devoted to permanent crops: orchards, olive groves, and vineyards. Another 5 million lay fallow each year because of inadequate rainfall. Permanent meadows and pastureland occupied 13.9 million hectares. Forests and scrub woodland accounted for 11.9 million hectares, and the balance was wasteland or was taken up by populated and industrial areas.

The primary forms of property holding in Spain have been large estates (latifundios) and tiny land plots (minifundios). In large measure, this was still true in the 1980s. The agrarian census of 1982 found that 50.9 percent of the country's farmland was held in properties of 200 or more hectares, although farms of this size made up only 1.1 percent of the country's 2.3 million farms. At the other end of the scale, the census showed that 61.8 percent of Spain's farms had fewer than 5 hectares of land. These farms accounted for 5.2 percent of the country's farmland.

Just under 25 percent of all farms consisted of less than 1 hectare of land, and they accounted for 0.5 percent of all farmland. Minifundios were particularly numerous in the north and the northwest. Latifundios were mainly concentrated in the south, in Castilla-La Mancha, Extremadura, Valencia, and Andalusia.

Crop areas were farmed in two main manners. Areas relying on non-irrigated cultivation (secano), which made up 85 percent of the entire crop area, depended solely on rainfall as a source of water. They included the humid regions of the north and the northwest, as well as vast arid zones that had not been irrigated. The much more productive regions devoted to irrigated cultivation (regadio) accounted for 3 million hectares in 1986, and the government hoped that this area would eventually double, as it already had doubled since 1950. Particularly noteworthy was the development in Almeria—one of the most arid and desolate provinces of Spain—of winter crops of various fruits and vegetables for export to Europe.

Though only about 17 percent of Spain's cultivated land was irrigated, it was estimated to be the source of between 40 and 45 percent of the gross value of crop production and of 50 percent of the value of agricultural exports. More than half of the irrigated area was planted in corn, fruit trees, and vegetables. Other agricultural products that benefited from irrigation included grapes, cotton, sugar beets, potatoes, legumes, olive trees, strawberries, tomatoes, and fodder grasses. Depending on the nature of the crop, it was possible to harvest two successive crops in the same year on about 10 percent of the country's irrigated land.

Citrus fruits, vegetables, cereal grains, olive oil, and wine—Spain's traditional agricultural products—continued to be important in the 1980s. In 1983 they represented 12 percent, 12 percent, 8 percent, 6 percent, and 4 percent, respectively, of the country's agricultural production. Because of the changed diet of an increasingly affluent population, there was a notable increase in the consumption of livestock, poultry, and dairy products. Meat production for domestic consumption became the single most important agricultural activity, accounting for 30 percent of all farm-related production in 1983.

Increased attention to livestock was the reason that Spain became a net importer of grains. Ideal growing conditions, combined with proximity to important north European markets, made citrus fruits Spain's leading export. Fresh vegetables and fruits produced through intensive irrigation farming also became important export commodities, as did sunflower seed oil that was produced to compete with the more expensive olive oils in oversupply throughout the Mediterranean countries of the EC.

=== Regional variation ===
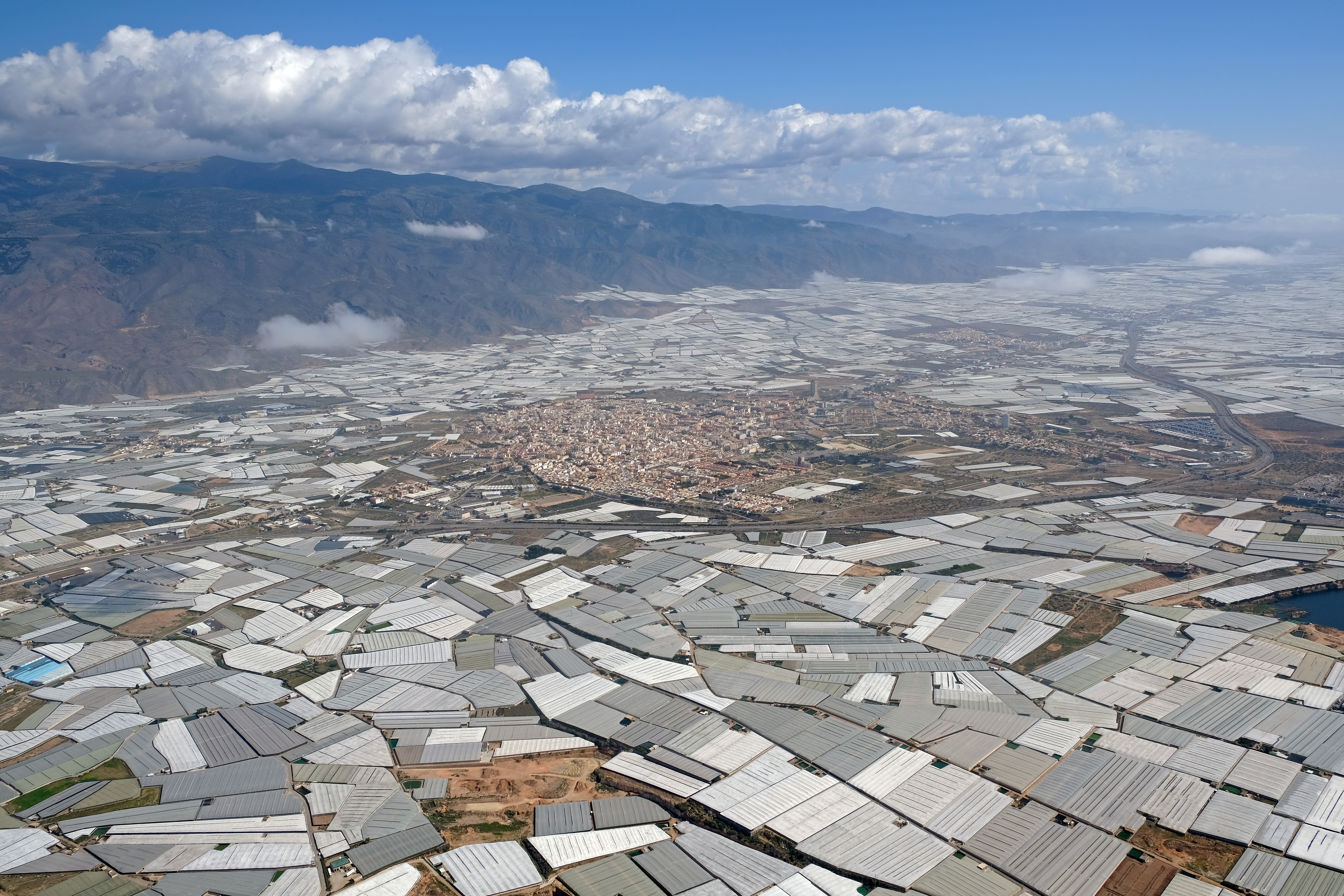
Greenhouses in El Ejido, Almería.

Because the interior of Spain is dominated by semiarid plateaus and mountains subject to temperature extremes, the most productive agricultural areas in the late 1980s tend to be the coastal regions. Thus the north and the northwest, where there is a relatively mild, humid climate were the principal corn-producing and cattle-raising areas. Apples and pears were the main orchard crops in this area, and potatoes were another of its leading products.

Galicia, which consists of Spain's four westernmost provinces directly north of Portugal, had a concentrated farm population living on intensely fragmented plots. Accordingly, per capita farm income was low, compared with that of the northern provinces lying to the east, where there were fewer people and higher per capita income levels because of a more diversified economy that included industry, mining, and tourism.

Valencian Community, on the eastern coast, has a climate that permits very diversified agriculture. The biggest fruit production in Valencia, by far, are the citrus species, predominantly oranges. tangerines and lemons, and to a lesser extent grapefruits and bitter oranges. The Valencian Community produces more than 3 million tons of citrus per year, representing 60% of the Spanish citrus production. The subtropical climate found on the coast and low altitude areas, along with the fertile terrain, have filled the Valencian Community with citrus plantations all the way from northern Castellón to southern Alicante. There are lots of different varieties grown in this region. The earliest ones are tangerines that start to be collected in early September and the latest are the late Valencia orange navel class that ends in late June and are mostly used to make juices. Valencia has also very big expanses of rice fields producing rice, concentrated mostly around the low-lying areas of the central part of the province of Valencia, taking advantage of the Albufera sweet water wetlands. Avocado is also becoming a very important fruit, as it meets the climate and requirements to grow on a large scale. Avocado orchards are being planted quickly and avocado is slowly replacing citrus cultivars as avocado is much more economically viable. In the inland areas, cultivations of cherries. almonds and olives are also very prevalent, mostly in the inland areas of the provinces of Valencia and Alicante. Sugarcane used to be very important in the past, although it has been replaced by oranges over the past centuries.

Catalonia, on the northeast coast, also has a climate that permits diversified agriculture. At the end of the 1980s, livestock, particularly the expanding poultry industry, was important in the area. Modern farming methods, including the use of tractors, were more advanced here than they were in the rest of the country. South of Catalonia, along the narrow Mediterranean coast, or Levante, was Spain's principal area of intensive, irrigated horticulture. Oranges, orchard fruits, rice, and vegetables were produced in this region, and farther to the south, fig trees and nut trees were grown.

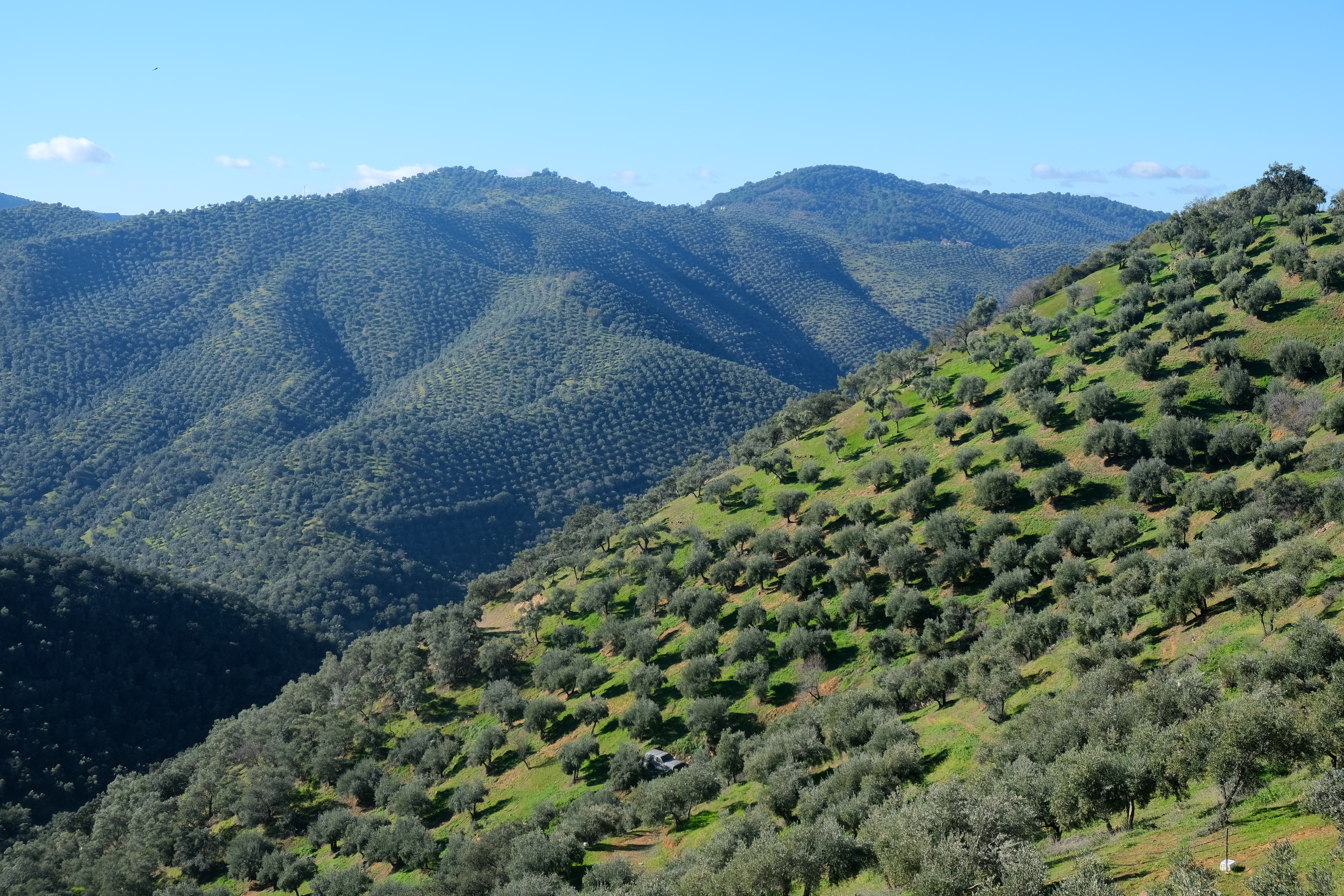
Olive trees in Andalusia.

Andalusia, which includes all of tillable southern Spain, was another major agricultural area in the late 1980s. It was also the target of several agricultural planning programs. Although olive trees grow throughout the Mediterranean coastal region, as well as in parts of the Meseta Central (Central Plateau), they constituted the most important crop in Andalusia, particularly in the province of Jaén. Other warm-weather crops, such as cotton, tobacco, and sugarcane, were also produced in Andalusia, as were wine and table grapes.

The vast dry plateau region of central Spain contrasted sharply with the country's relatively productive areas. The production of agricultural commodities was particularly difficult in central Spain because of a lack of rainfall, a scarcity of trees and other vegetation, extremes of temperature, and harsh, rocky soil. Nevertheless, the farmers of the region grew wheat and other grains, raised sheep and goats, maintained vineyards, and carried on other agricultural activities.

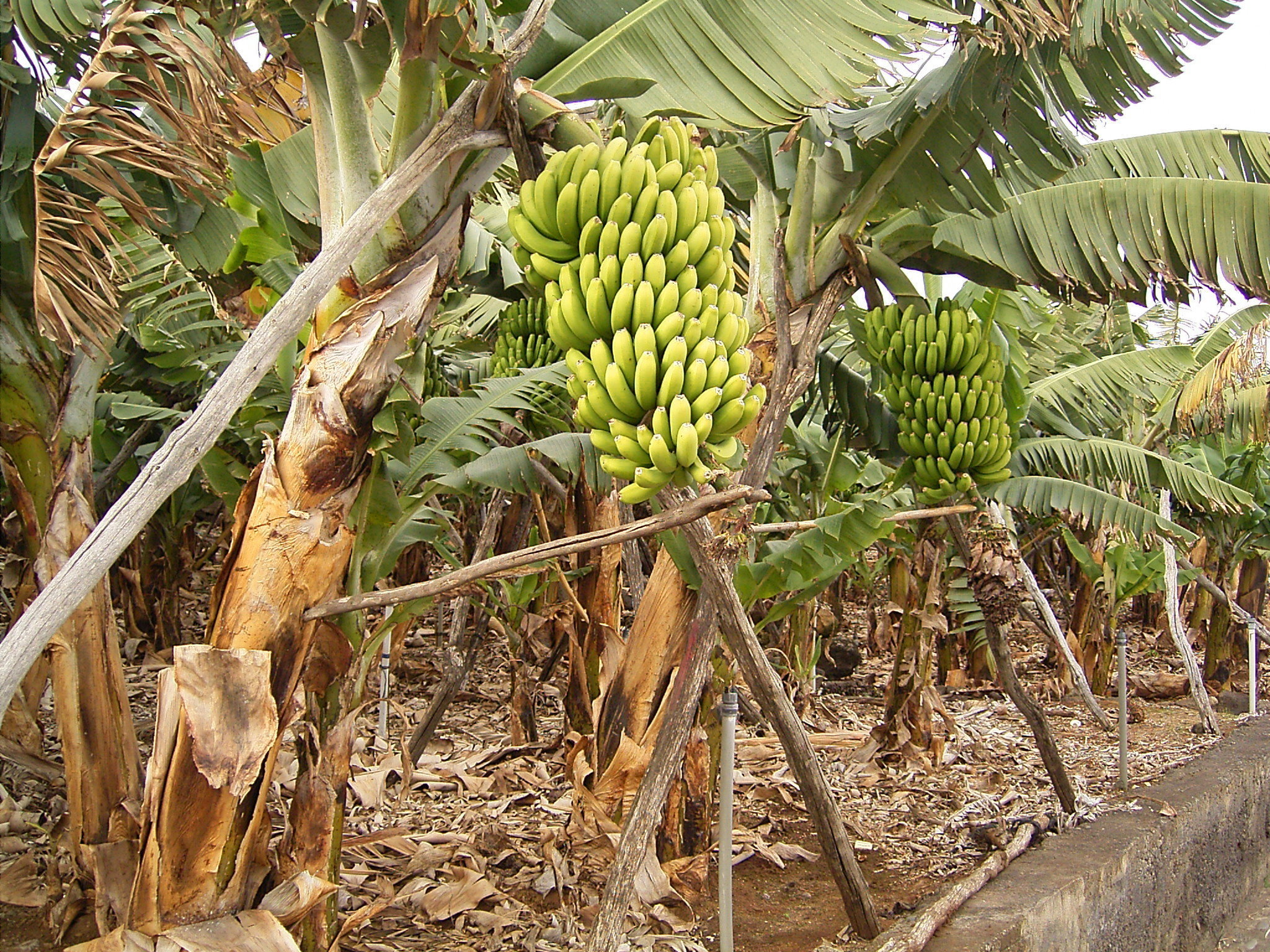
Banana plantations in the Canary Islands

An important irrigation system lies just northwest of the northern Meseta and south of the Pyrenees in the Ebro Basin, where Spain's best known vineyard district is located in the autonomous community of La Rioja. Because of its irrigation, corn, sugar beets, and orchard fruits were grown in this area, and the Ebro Delta was one of Spain's principal rice-growing regions.

In the Balearic Islands (Spanish: Islas Baleares), the uncertain, sparse rainfall and the lack of permanent fresh water streams were somewhat compensated for by good supplies of underground water. Irrigation permitted the production of a wide range of temperate and semitropical tree crops for export, as well as enough cereals, legumes, wines, and vegetables for local consumption. Sheep, goats, pigs, and poultry were also raised on the islands.

Agriculture in the Canary Islands (Spanish: Islas Canarias) was limited by water shortages and mountainous terrain. Nevertheless, a variety of vegetable and fruit crops were produced for local consumption, and there was a significant and exportable surplus of tomatoes and bananas.

=== Climate change ===
Climate change impacts are being observed globally, with certain regions that are already water scarce having higher levels of vulnerability. Spain is predicted to be highly vulnerable because of uneven availability of water resources, and due to existing demands. As a result of its geographic and socio-economic characteristics, Spain is regarded as one of the most vulnerable countries to climate change in the European Union. Models forecast further increases in temperature and reductions in precipitation, which will likely have a profound impact on the region.

Desertification, one of the most significant impacts of climate change in Spain, poses a significant threat to a substantial portion of the country. Over 30% of the area is already severely impacted by desertification, with human activity in arid regions exacerbating the situation. Causes of desertification include forest fires, loss of vegetation cover, erosion, and salinization processes. Climate change projections predict an exacerbation of these issues, particularly in regions with a dry and semi-arid Mediterranean climate.

The agricultural sector is responsible for about 10% of greenhouse gas emissions in Spain. Livestock, particularly pig manure management, accounts for over half the emissions, while crop systems account for the remainder. While agriculture has shown the ability to adapt to long term changes, the magnitude of the changes due to climate change is likely to exceed the adaptive capacity of many European farmers. Therefore, sustainable agriculture requires the synergy of adaptation and mitigation, with no clear separation between them. The Spanish agriculture sector has already implemented several measures aimed at reducing emissions, improving knowledge about them, and introducing energy efficiency criteria in modernizing irrigation systems.

Climate change will have significant impacts on agriculture, ecosystems, and biodiversity, resulting in alterations to Spain's characteristics, accentuating the existing desertification issues, reducing water availability, increasing costs of adaptation measures, and potentially causing future problems such as pests, invasive species, and reduced crop yields. While agriculture is responsible for significant emissions, the efforts being made to address this also recognize its role as a carbon sink.

== History of agricultural development ==
Prior to the Spanish Civil War, Spain's agricultural output was among the lowest in Europe. These poor results were only marginally affected by the war, yet agricultural output during the 1940s remained below the 1933 level. This low agricultural productivity led to food rationing, substantially contributing to the great hardships endured by people living in the cities. One of the main reasons for this dilemma was the government preoccupation with industrial self-sufficiency, which resulted in neglect for the modernization of agriculture. The government did encourage grain cultivation with the aim of achieving agricultural self-sufficiency, but heavy-handed efforts to control food prices led to the massive channeling of agricultural products into the black market.

The traditional shortcomings of Spanish agriculture — excessive land fragmentation (minifundismo) and extremely large land tracts in the hands of a few (latifundismo) — were, for all practical purposes, ignored. As in the past, latifundio areas with low yields and little irrigation were primarily devoted to the production of such traditional commodities as olive oil, grains, and wine. They were, moreover, the areas where casual rural laborers (braceros) were concentrated, where wage levels were lowest, and where illiteracy rates were highest.

A gradual change in Spanish agriculture began in the 1950s, when prices rapidly increased, and the surplus labor pool began to shrink, as a half million rural field hands migrated to the cities or went abroad in search of a better life. Nonetheless, more substantial changes did not take place prior to the 1960s. The Stabilization Plan of 1959 encouraged emigration from rural areas, and the economic boom in both Spain and Western Europe provided increased opportunities for employment. The subsequent loss of rural manpower had a far-reaching effect on both agricultural prices and wage levels and, as a consequence, on the composition of Spanish agriculture.

Spain's economic transformation in the 1960s and in the first half of the 1970s caused tremendous outmigration from rural areas. Between 1960 and 1973, 1.8 million people migrated to urban areas. Even later, between 1976 and 1985, when the economy was experiencing serious difficulties, the fall in farm employment averaged 4 percent per annum. The results of these migrations were reflected in the changing percentage of the population involved in farming. In 1960, 42 percent of the population was engaged in agricultural work. By 1986 about 15 percent was so employed — a marked reduction, though still twice as high as the European Community (EC) average.

As Spain became more industrialized, the declining share of agriculture in the economy was evidenced by its declining share of the GDP. Agriculture accounted for 23 percent of GDP in 1960; for 15 percent, in 1970; and for 5 percent, by 1986. In addition, the character of Spanish agriculture in the 1980s had changed. It had become less a way of life and more a way of making a living. Even subsistence agriculture, already in steady decline, had become increasingly market oriented.

The magnitude of the rural exodus permitted the government to undertake a program of parcel consolidation, that is, to bring together into single plots many tiny, scattered pieces of land that characterized the minifundio sector. The government managed to surpass its goal of consolidating 1 million hectares of small land holdings between 1964 and 1967; by 1981 it had brought together a total of 5 million hectares.

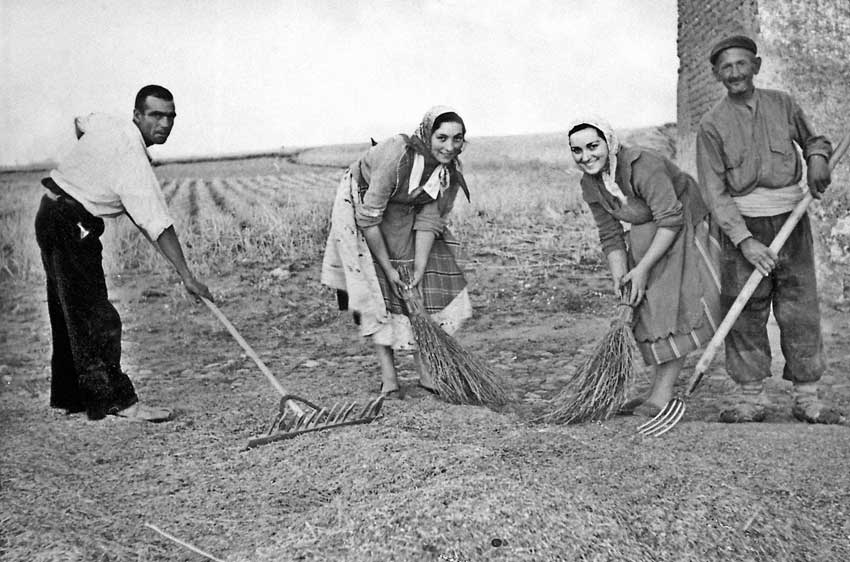
Threshing farmers in the 1950s

The decreased size of the rural work force affected Spanish agriculture because its traditionally labor-intensive practices required a large pool of cheap labor. The workers who remained in the countryside saw their wages advanced by 83.8 percent between 1960 and 1970 — a rate that roughly followed the wage increases in industry. At the same time increased agricultural labor costs led to the end of countless minifundios. The 1982 agrarian census recorded the disappearance of about one-half million small farms between 1962 and 1982.

The resulting lack of a ready labor supply was an incentive to mechanise, particularly for large landed estates. The number of farm tractors expanded more than tenfold between 1960 and 1983, from 52,000 to 593,000. The number of combine harvester-threshers increased almost tenfold over the same period, from 4,600 to 44,000. The process of mechanization caused agricultural productivity to grow by 3.5 percent per year between 1960 and 1978, and the productivity of farm workers grew even faster. Nonetheless, Spain's output per agricultural worker remained low. It was about half the EC average in 1985, and it surpassed only those of Greece and Portugal.

During the mid-1980s, Spanish agriculture was roughly self-sufficient in years when there were good harvests, and in nearly every year there were sizable surpluses of olive oil, citrus fruits, and wine that could be exported in quantities large enough to make it the EC's third-largest food supplier. In years of poor or average harvests, the country was obliged to import grains for use as animal fodder, but on the whole Spain was a net exporter of foodstuffs.

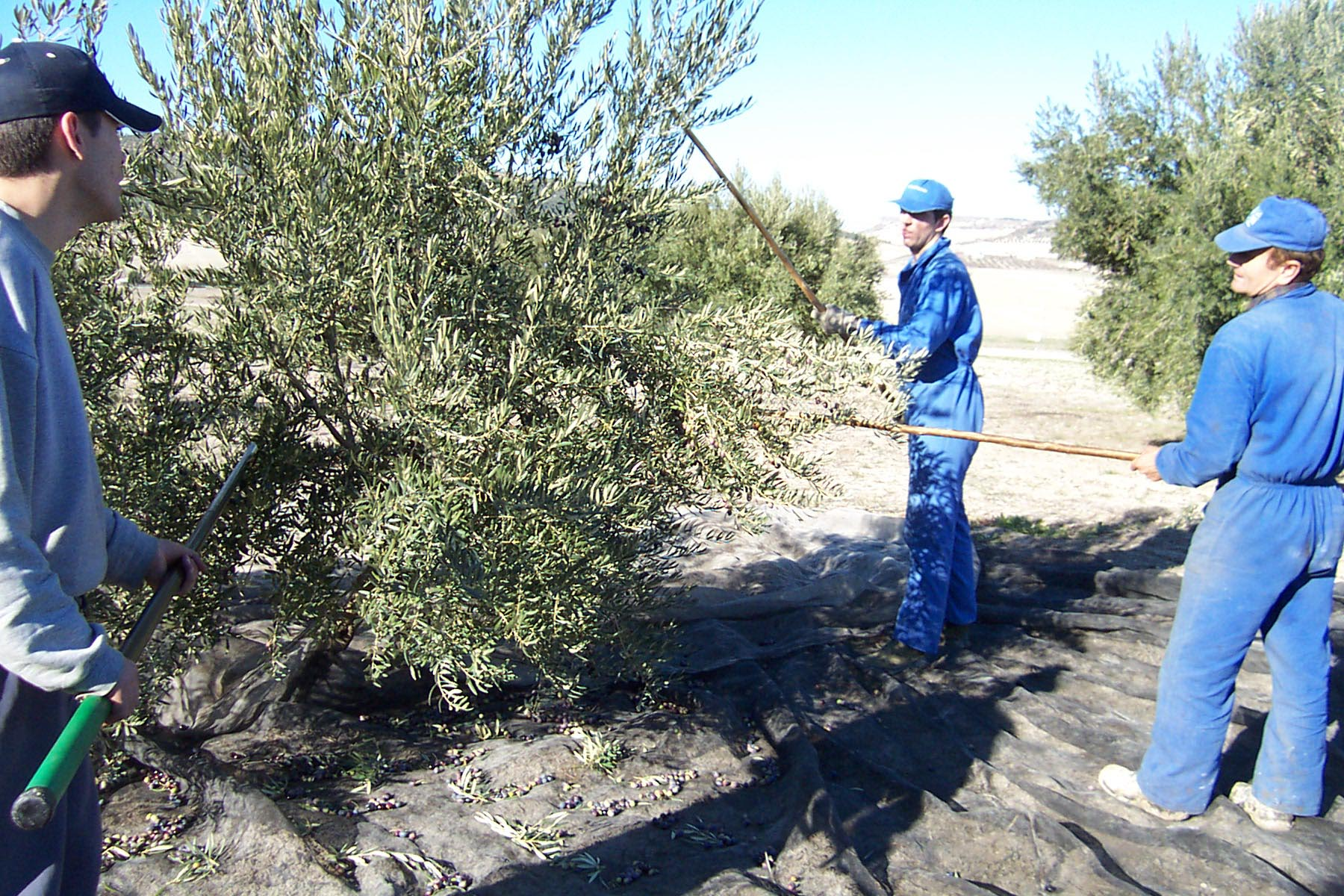
Aceituneros of the province of Jaén in the 2000s

Spanish agriculture varied considerably with regard to regional differences in output. Some regions were distinguished by a highly inefficient variety of farming. Specialists estimated that areas dominated by minifundios would have to lose an estimated three-fourths of their farming population if they were to compete effectively with foreign producers. The variety of agriculture practiced along the Mediterranean coast or in the Rio Ebro Valley was, however, highly efficient and capable of keeping up with foreign competition.

Opinion was not united as to what EC membership would eventually mean for Spanish farmers. The EC's Common Agricultural Policy (CAP), which aimed at supporting most of each member state's farming sector, was expensive, and by the 1980s it was consuming well over half of the organization's revenues. If the CAP were continued, it would not be likely to have a considerable effect on Spanish agriculture, for a system of domestic price supports had long protected the weaker parts of the nation's farm sector. A change of EC policy that encouraged a single community-wide agricultural system might allow those parts of the Spanish agricultural sector that outperformed their rivals in the EC to prosper, while backward branches would probably disappear.

== Production ==
Spain produced, in 2018:

- 9.8 million tons of olives (largest producer in the world);
- 9.1 million tons of barley (5th largest producer in the world);
- 7.9 million tons of wheat (19th largest producer in the world);
- 6.6 million tons of grape (4th largest producer in the world, behind China, Italy and USA);
- 4.7 million tons of tomato (8th largest producer in the world);
- 3.8 million tons of maize;
- 3.6 million tons of orange (6th largest producer in the world);
- 2.8 million tons of sugar beet, which is used to produce sugar and ethanol;
- 2 million tonnes of potato;
- 1.9 million tonnes of tangerine (2nd largest producer in the world, only behind China);
- 1.4 million tons of oats (3rd largest producer in the world, only behind Russia and Canada);
- 1.2 million tons of onion (17th largest producer in the world);
- 1.2 million tons of chili pepper (5th largest producer in the world);
- 1.1 million tons of watermelon (14th largest producer in the world);
- 1 million tons of lemon (7th largest producer in the world);
- 950 thousand tons of sunflower seed (11th largest producer in the world);
- 934 thousand tons of lettuce and chicory;
- 903 thousand tons of peach (4th largest producer in the world, only behind China, Italy and Greece);
- 818 thousand tons of rice;
- 725 thousand tons of cauliflower and broccoli;
- 717 thousand tons of pumpkin;
- 664 thousand tons of melon;
- 649 thousand tons of triticale;
- 562 thousand tons of apple;
- 492 thousand tons of persimmon (2nd largest producer in the world, only behind China);
- 388 thousand tons of rye (8th largest producer in the world);
- 386 thousand tons of banana;
- 382 thousand tons of carrots;
- 344 thousand tons of strawberry (6th largest producer in the world);
- 339 thousand tons of almond (2nd largest producer in the world, only behind the USA);
- 332 thousand tons of pear;
- 273 thousand tons of garlic;
- 262 thousand tons of dry pea;
- 238 thousand tons of eggplant;
- 213 thousand tons of cabbage;
- 208 thousand tons of artichoke (3rd largest producer in the world, behind Italy and Egypt);
- 176 thousand tons of apricot (6th largest producer in the world);

In addition to smaller productions of other agricultural products.

== Crops ==
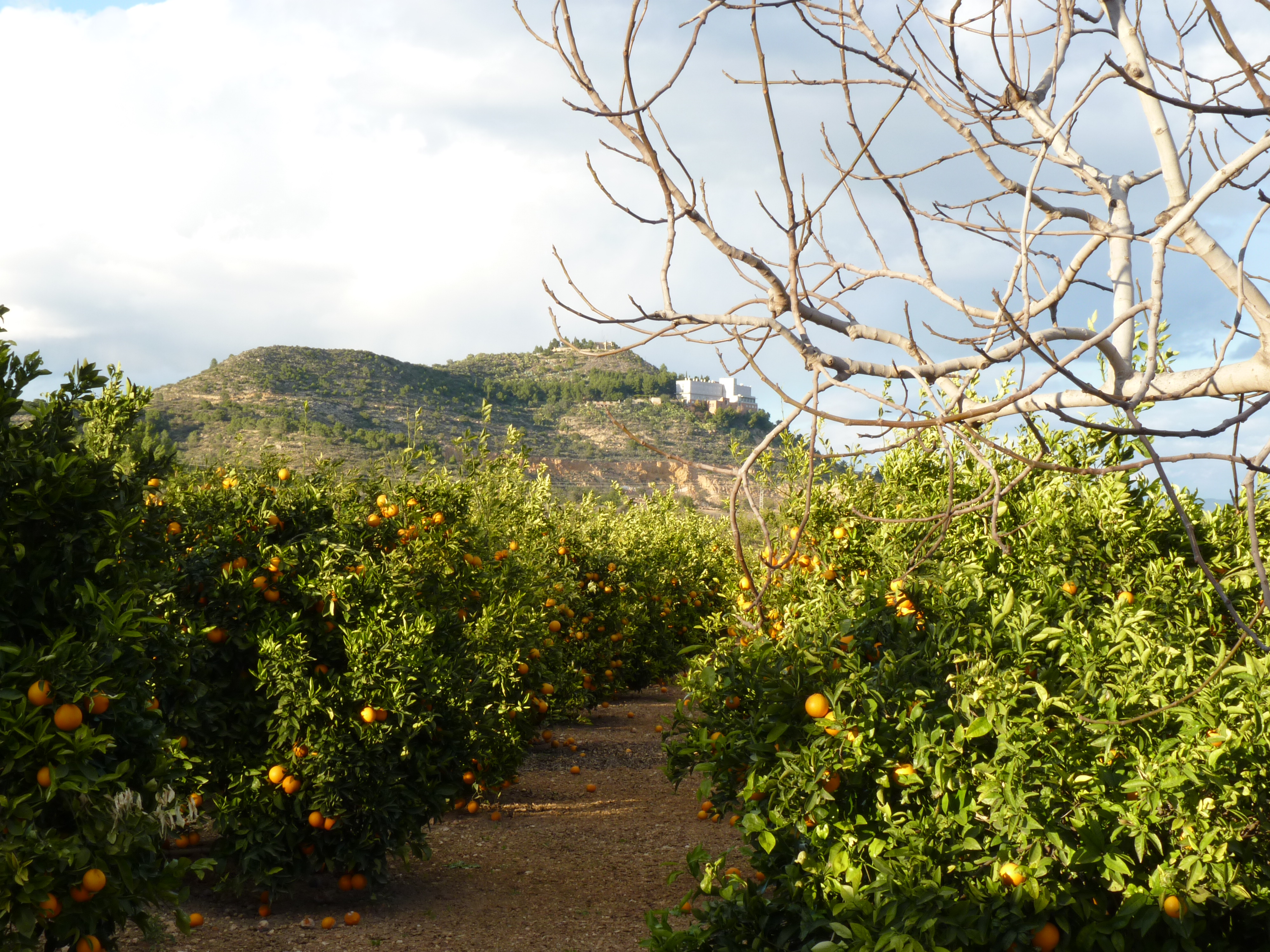
Orange tree orchard in Benaguasil, Valencian Community, in Eastern Spain.

Spain has long been Western Europe's leading producer, and the world's foremost exporter, of oranges and mandarins. In the early 1960s, the production of these commodities averaged 1.8 million tons a year, and by the 1980s the annual yield averaged about 3 million tons. Grapefruit, lemons, and limes were also grown in quantity, but Spain was second to Italy among West European producers of these fruits. Spain's citrus groves, all under irrigation, were concentrated in Mediterranean coastal provinces, the Levante, primarily in a narrow coastal strip 500 kilometers in length extending from the province of Castellón to the province of Almería. Some citrus fruit production also was found in Andalusia. Nowadays citrus production is still important, and Spain is by far the biggest producer of citrus in Europe and one of the biggest in the world. In 2022 the government of Andalusia provided a mandate for the European Investment Bank to establish and operate an innovative guarantee fund of up to €50 million in order to support the growth of its agricultural and agrifood industries. The Andalusia regional government and the European Agricultural Support for Rural Development jointly fund the guarantee fund.

Spain's other significant orchard crops were apples, bananas, pears, peaches, apricots, plums, cherries, figs, and nuts. Except for bananas, which were grown only in the Canary Islands, and figs, which were grown mostly in the Balearic Islands, orchard crops were produced primarily in the Levante and in Catalonia. The Catalan province of Lérida was the leading producer of apples and pears, and it ranked second to Murcia in the production of peaches. Almonds, grown along the southern and the eastern coasts, emerged as another important Spanish cash crop. Almost half of the 1985 crop was exported, approximately 70 to 75 percent of it to EC countries.

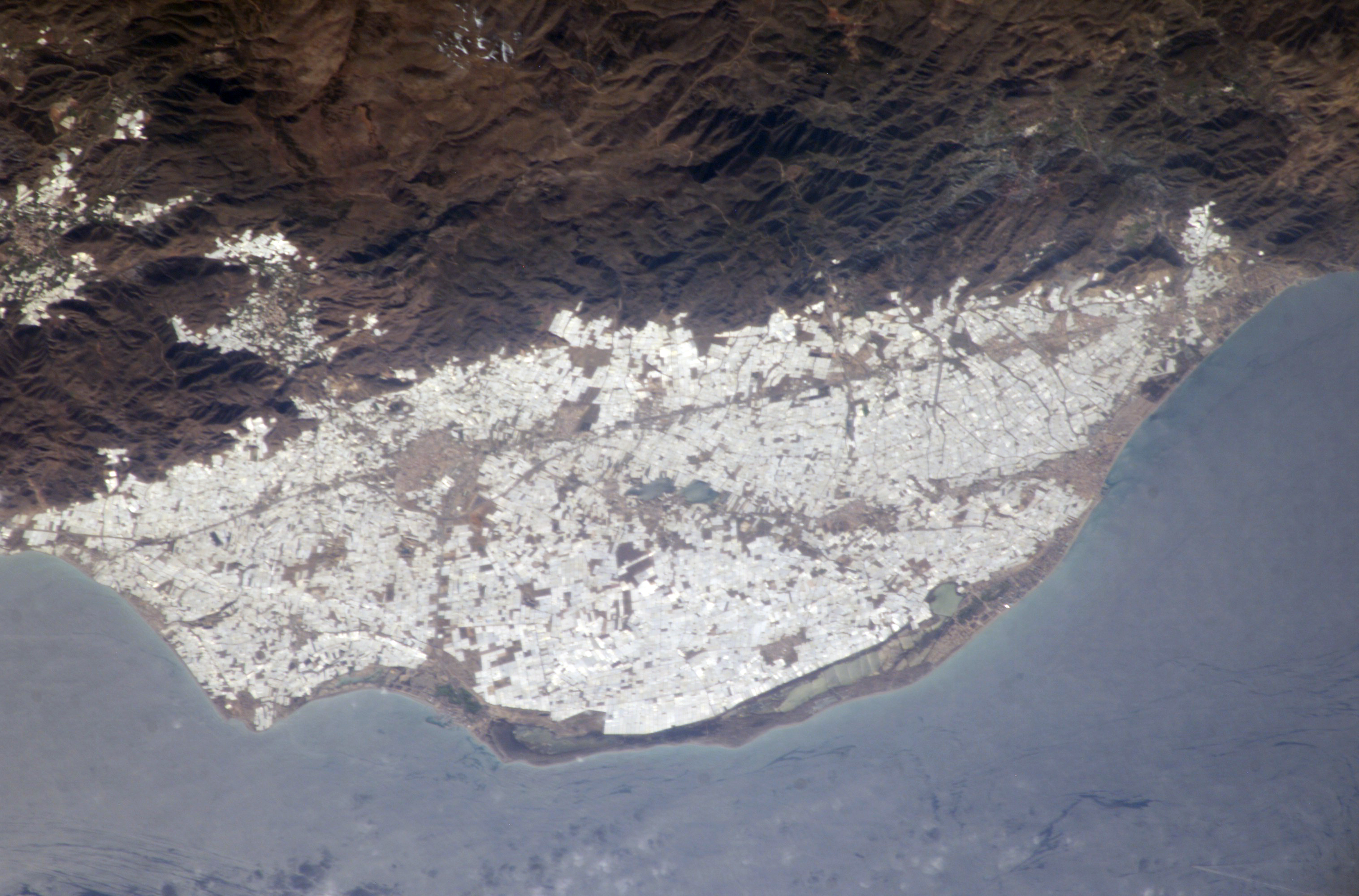
The "sea of plastic" - greenhouses covering 20,000 ha of the Campo de Dalías around El Ejido and Roquetas de Mar in southern Spain.

The principal vegetable crops were potatoes, tomatoes, onions, cabbages, peppers, and string beans. Spain was the leading producer of onions in Western Europe, and it was second only to Italy in the production of tomatoes. These crops were concentrated in Andalusia and in the intensively cultivated and largely irrigated Mediterranean coastal areas, where small garden plots known as huertas were common. The Canary Islands also produced a significant proportion of Spain's tomatoes. Potatoes were a prominent garden crop in the northwest.

Spain was the world's leading producer and exporter of olives and olive oil, although in some years Italy showed higher production levels because Spanish harvests were notably vulnerable to insects, frost, and storm damage. Andalusia, where about one-half of the olive groves were found, is generally free of these hazards, but olives were grown in virtually every province except the humid north and the northwest. In the 1980s, olive production fluctuated wildly, ranging from 1.2 million to 3.3 million tons per year. Olive oil production was also volatile. Spain's olive production is affected by European Community quotas, and past efforts to control overproduction have included the destruction of olive groves.

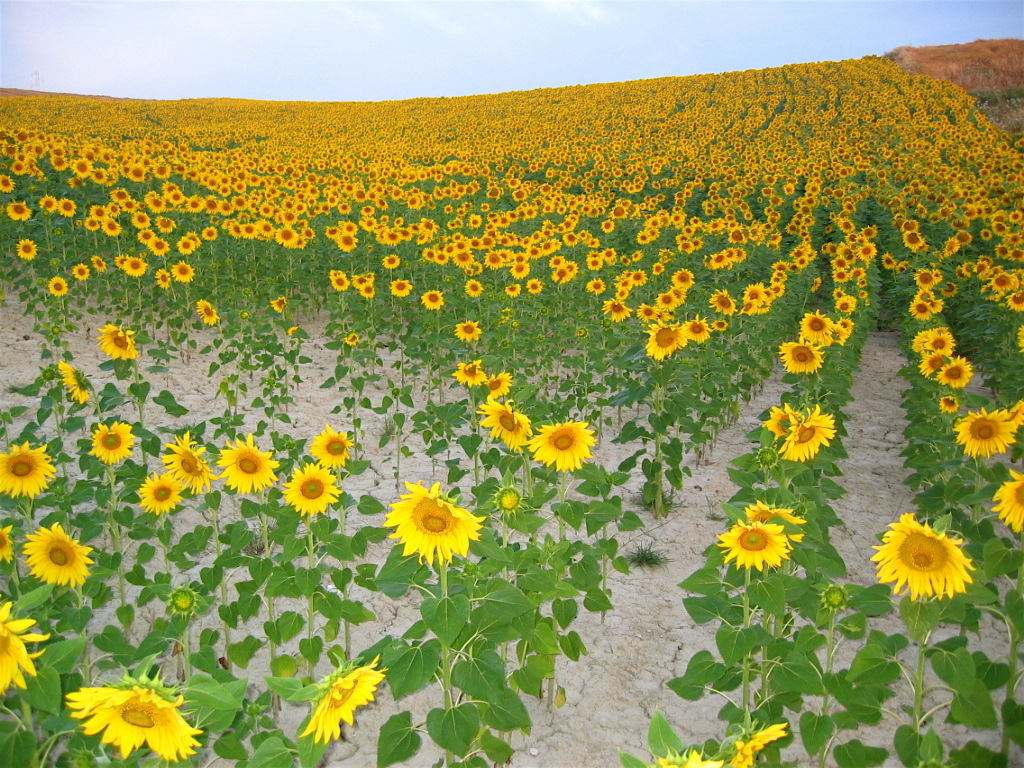
Sunflowers growing in Cendea de Cizur.

Though Spain boasted the world's largest area of land devoted to vineyards, much of the wine it produced was of mediocre quality. Vineyards were usually located on poor land, and good wine-making technology was often lacking. In the past, government-guaranteed prices for wine tended to encourage quantity rather than quality and alcoholic content, but programs were instituted in the 1980s to upgrade production, and surpluses of poor-quality white wine were more regularly distilled into industrial alcohol. Supported by the restructuring and reconversion program initiated by the government in 1984 and by an EC assistance program, Spain's vineyard acreage continued to decline, and it was expected to fall to 100,000 hectares by 1990. Spain's 1986 wine production was estimated at 36.7 million hectoliters.

Grains covered about 10 percent of Spain's cultivated lands, and about 10 percent of that area was irrigated. Wheat and barley were generally grown in the dry areas because corn tends to crowd such crops out of areas with more abundant rainfall or irrigation. Although most of the wheat was grown in dry upland areas, some of it also was grown on valuable irrigated land. Rice was dependent on plentiful water supplies and, accordingly, was produced in the irrigated areas of the Levante, in Andalusia, and at the mouth of the Rio Ebro. Spanish farmers also grew rye, oats, and sorghum.

During the mid-1980s, the grain crop usually hit record highs of about 20 million tons, compared to 13 million tons in 1983. This meant that Spain, long a grain-importing nation, now produced a surplus of cereals. Barley had come to account for about one-half of the grain harvest and corn for about one-sixth of it, as the government encouraged production of these crops in order to reduce imports of animal feed grains. Although the wheat crop was subject to wide fluctuations because of variable weather conditions, it generally provided about one-fourth of Spain's total grain production, which exceeded the country's needs. Rice and oats constituted the rest of the national total. Some rice and wheat were exported with the help of subsidies, and analysts expected the surplus of wheat and the deficit of corn to continue into the 1990s.

To make up for the shortage of domestic feed grains, Spain became one of the world's largest importers of soybeans, and it developed a modern oilseed-crushing industry of such high productivity that surplus soybean oil became one of Spain's most important agricultural export commodities. The government encouraged domestic production of soybeans to lessen the heavy dependence on soybean imports. To limit the impact of this production on the important, labor-intensive, olive oil industry, which provided work for many field hands in southern Spain, a domestic tax system was established that maintained a two-to-one olive oil-soybean oil price ratio. The revenues derived from this system subsidized large exports of surplus soybean oil. The United States, once the main source of soybean imports, lodged protests against this policy, both bilaterally and internationally, but with little effect as of 1988.

As a further step in reducing Spanish dependence on imported soybeans, the government encouraged sunflower production. Especially favorable growing conditions, coupled with generous government support, caused sunflower seed output to expand spectacularly, and the amount of land used for its cultivation went from virtually nothing in 1960 to approximately 1 million hectares in the 1980s. Sunflower-seed meal was not the most desirable livestock feed, and therefore was not used in this way, but by the 1980s most Spanish households used the cooking oil it provided because it was less expensive than olive oil.

About 8 percent of the cultivated land in Spain was devoted to legumes and to industrial crops. Edible legumes were grown in virtually every province; French beans and kidney beans predominated in the wetter regions; and chick peas (garbanzos) and lentils, in the arid regions. However, Spain was a net importer of legumes. Although consumption of these crops declined as the standard of living improved, domestic production also fell.

Sugar beets were Spain's most important industrial crop. Annual production in the mid-1980s averaged about 7 million tons. Cultivation was widely scattered, but the heaviest production was found in the Guadalquivir Basin, in the province of León, and around Valladolid. A small amount of sugarcane was grown in the Guadalquivir Basin. Sugar production, controlled to meet EC quotas, was usually sufficient to meet domestic needs.

Although small quantities of tobacco, cotton, flax, and hemp were also cultivated, they were not adequate to fulfill Spain's needs. But esparto grass, a native Mediterranean fiber used in making paper, rope, and basketry, grew abundantly in the southeastern part of the country.

== Livestock ==
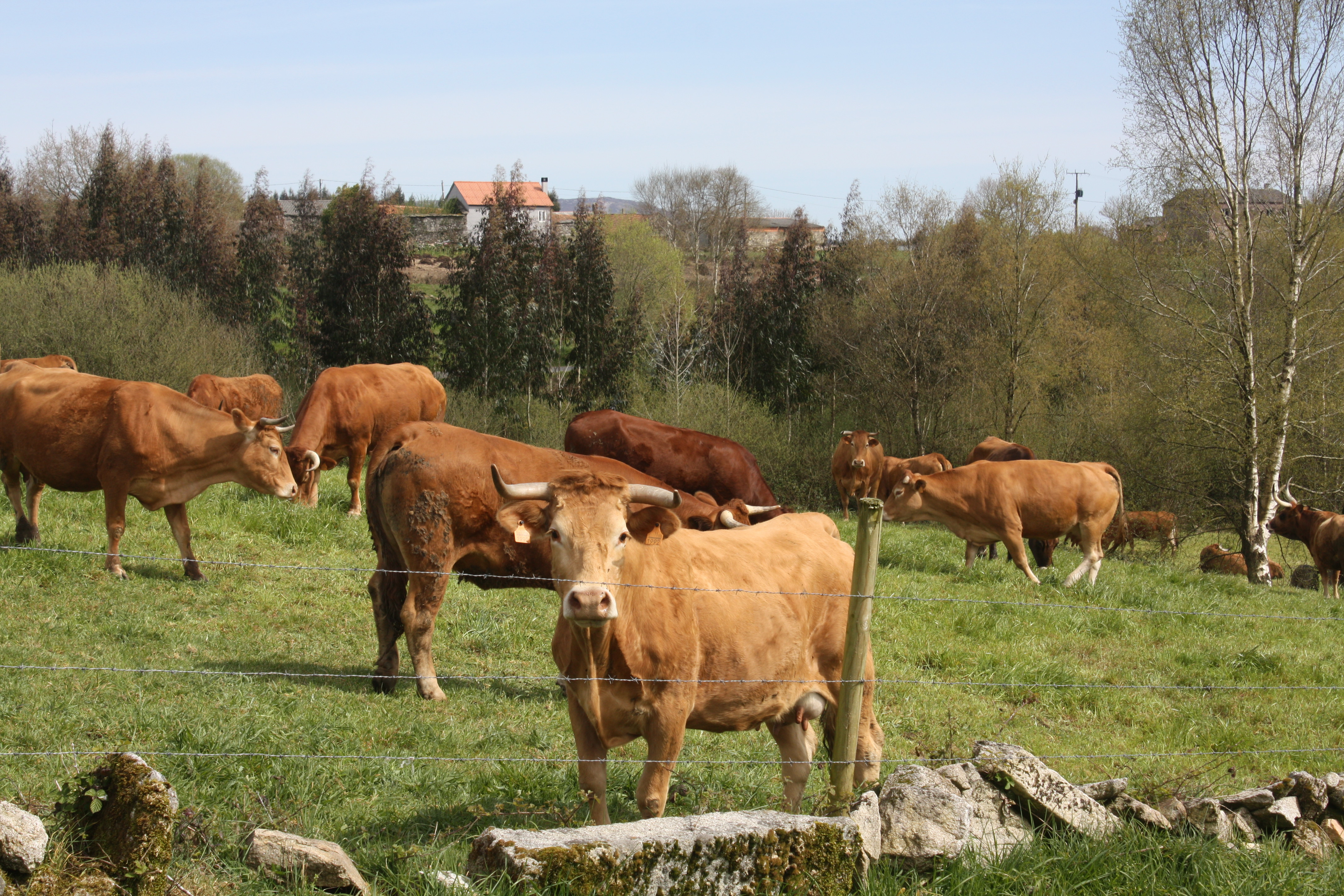
Cattle in Dozón, Galicia.

Spanish meat production in 1986 totalled 2,497,000 tons. The country's farmers produced 137,000 tons of lamb and mutton, 435,000 tons of beef and veal, 765,000 tons of poultry, and 1,160,000 tons of pork. With some fluctuations, these figures were representative of Spain's meat production during the 1980s. Spanish livestock industries had experienced significant growth and modernization since the 1950s, but their output remained well behind the levels of efficiency and productivity of European Community (EC) countries.

The EC states' generous subsidies and their experience in the use of expensive feed grains gave their livestock industries a decided competitive advantage. As the Spanish livestock sector was increasingly concentrated in northern Spain, where minifundio agriculture predominated, many Spanish cattleraising farms were too small fully to exploit the efficiencies of modern technology. Domestic meat production failed to meet demand, making Spain a net importer of farm animals and meat products.

Pork was Spain's most important meat product, and the number of pigs grew from 7.6 million in 1970 to 11.4 million in 1985. Pigs were raised unpenned in the central uplands, but they were generally pen-fed in the northern regions. At times African swine fever was a serious impediment to pork exports. Poultry raising had also expanded rapidly, and the number of chickens had doubled between 1970 and 1985, when it reached 54 million. The emphasis was on poultry production for meat rather than for eggs, because poultry, previously a minor item in the Spanish diet, had become much more popular. The most important areas for poultry raising were in the maize-growing provinces of the north and the northwest, but Catalonia, Valencia, and Andalusia were also important.

The principal cattle areas were in the north, the northwest, and, to a lesser degree, in Extremadura, Andalusia, the Rio Duero Basin, and the Murcia-Valencia lowlands. These regions provided the suitable pastures that were available only in areas with humid climates or with irrigated land. In 1986 Spain had 5 million cattle, including 1.9 million dairy cows. About 25 percent of the cattle were raised as oxen for draft purposes, and about 2 percent were bred for the bullring. The ranches of Extremadura and Andalusia specialized in raising animals of bullring quality.

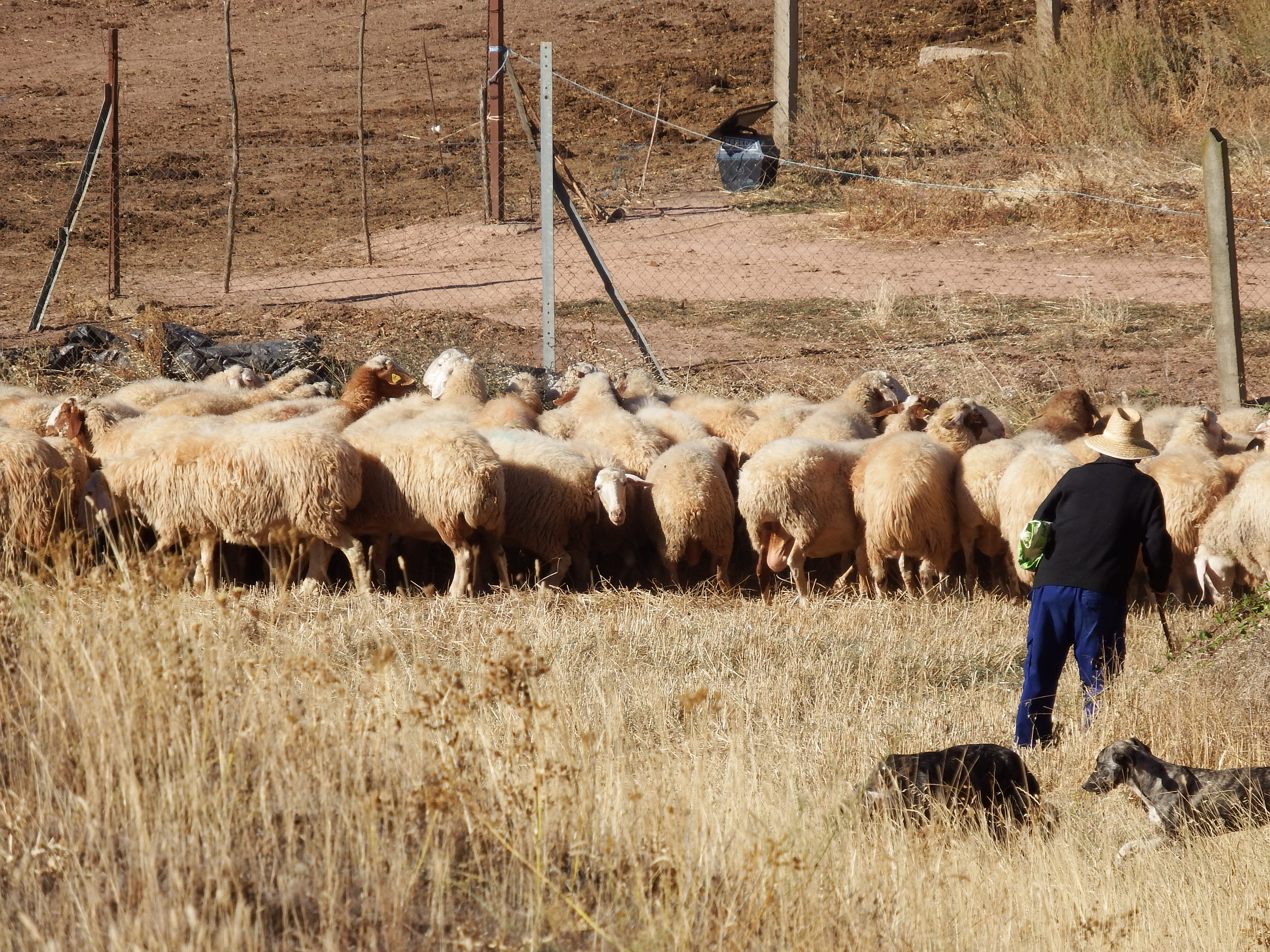
Shepherd and his sheep in Andavías, Zamora.

The dairy industry had grown rapidly. Milk production from cows, sheep, and goats, which had stood at 5.4 million tons in 1974, reached 6.4 million tons in 1986 — well over double the production level of the early 1960s. The bulk of milk products came from Galicia, Asturias, and Santander. In 1982 the government launched a program designed to modernize milk production, to improve its quality, and to concentrate it in the northern provinces. The dairy industry was not seriously hurt by Spain's entry into the European Community, although the 3 percent quota reduction for each of the years 1987 and 1988 and the 5.5 percent voluntary cutback hampered development.

Spain's sheep population remained almost unchanged at about 17 million between 1970 and 1985. Sheep rearing predominated in central Spain and the Ebro Basin. Goats were kept in much the same area, but they were more prevalent in the higher, less grassy elevations because they can survive on poorer pasture. Merino sheep, the best known breed, were probably imported from North Africa, and they were well adapted to semiarid conditions. Merino sheep, noted for their fine wool, were widely used as stock for new breeds. Other prominent breeds were the churro and the manchegan. Although raised primarily for wool, milk, and cheese, Spanish farm animals, particularly sheep, were increasingly used to satisfy the country's meat consumption needs.

== Forestry ==
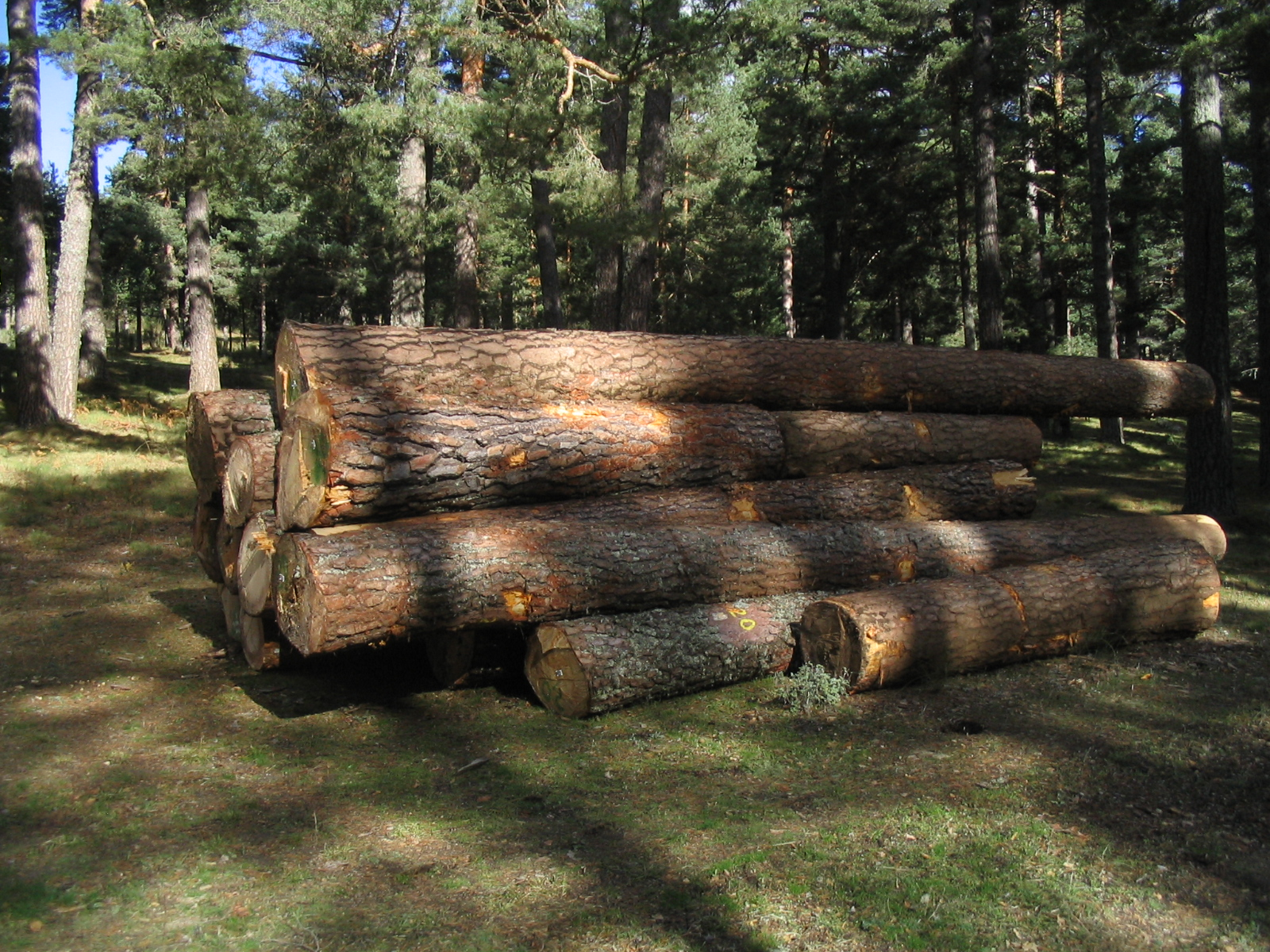
Logging near Navarredonda de Gredos.

Most of the natural forests of the Iberian Peninsula had long since disappeared because of erosion and uncontrolled harvesting for firewood, timber, or the creation of pastureland. In the 1980s, about 7 million hectares, or 14 percent of the land in Spain, could be considered usable forest, although another 3.5 million hectares of scrub growth were often included in forestland statistics.

A reforestation program had been under way in Spain since 1940. The aims of the program included meeting market demand for forest products, controlling erosion, and providing seasonal employment in rural areas. Eucalyptus trees, Lombardy poplars, and a variety of conifers were emphasized because of their fast growth.

Lumber output was approximately 12.3 million cubic meters in 1986, compared with 11.8 million cubic meters in 1985. Output could conceivably triple if 5.8 million hectares of the best forestland, which accounted for 50 percent of the total woodlands area, were properly developed and managed. Existing forestation programs were inadequate, however. For example, in the 1975-84 period, the balance between reforestation and the loss of forestland as a result of fires favored the latter by about 148,000 hectares. A report issued by the Forest Progress Association reported that, by the year 2000, Spain's wood deficit could reach between 8.5 and 16.9 million cubic meters.

The value of Spain's forest products in 1985 was US$302 million. Pine trees grown in the north and the northwest as well as oak and beech trees grown in the Pyrenees accounted for most of the total. Commercial forestry products produced in Spain included cork, turpentine, and resins.

Spain was the world's second largest producer of cork after Portugal. The best quality of cork, used for bottle stoppers, was grown in Catalonia. More plentiful lower grades, which went into linoleum, insulating materials, and other industrial products, came primarily from Andalusia and Extremadura. Cork production was declining, after reaching a high in the 1970s of 97,000 tons per year; only 46,000 tons were produced in 1985, as the widening use of plastics and other cork substitutes reduced demand.

== Fishing ==
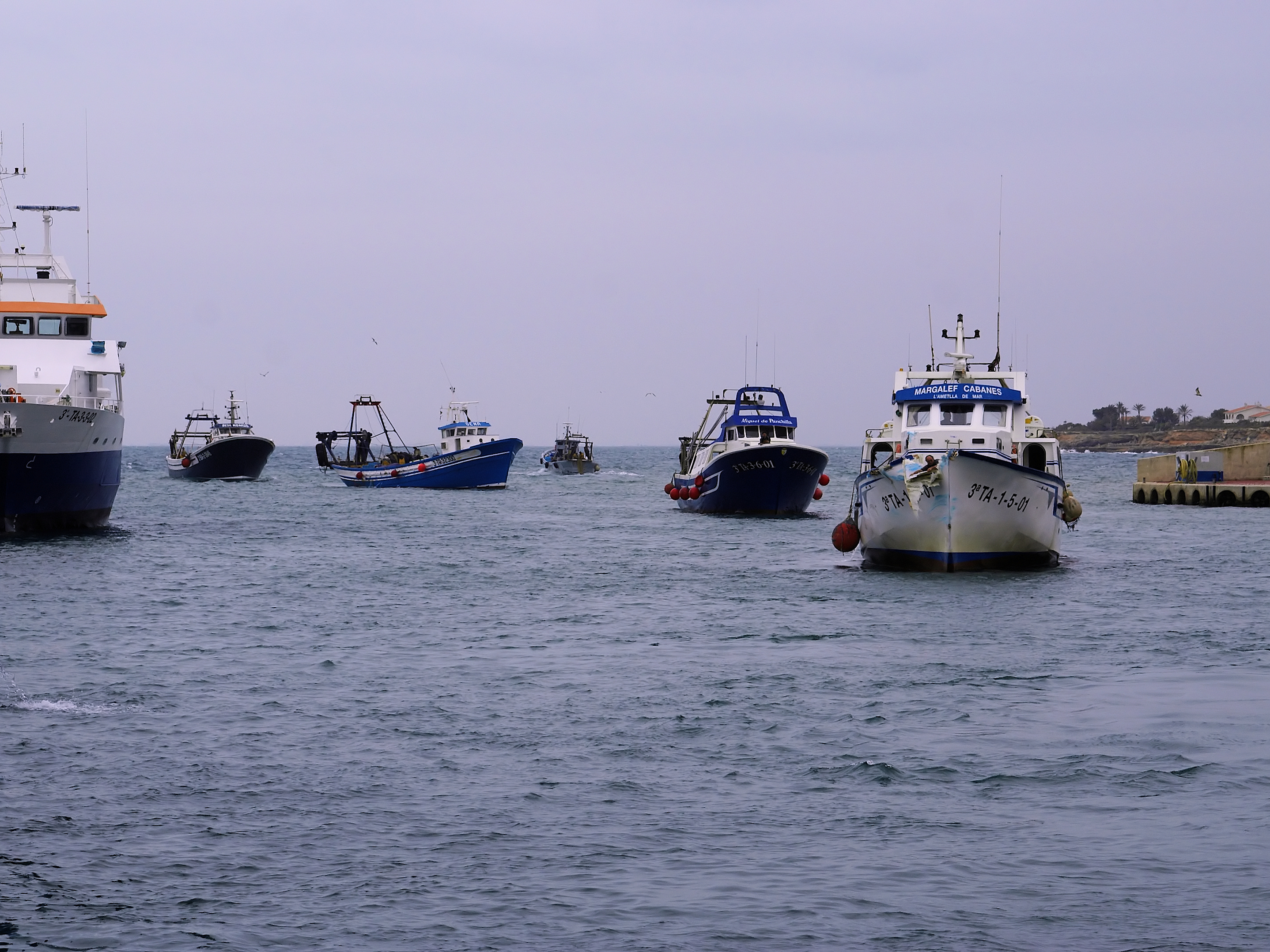
Fishing boats arriving at the port of L'Ametlla de Mar, Catalonia.

Spain was Western Europe's leading fishing nation, and it had the world's fourth largest fishing fleet. Spaniards ate more fish per capita than any other European people, except the Scandinavians. In the mid-1980s, Spain's fishing catch averaged about 1.3 million tons a year, and the fishing industry accounted for about 1 percent of GDP. Sardines, mussels, cephalopods, cod, mackerel, and tuna, most of which came from the Atlantic Ocean, were the principal components of the catch.

Fishing was particularly important in the economic life of Galicia, the principal fishing ports of which were Vigo and A Coruña on the northwest coast. Also important were Huelva, Cádiz, and Algeciras in the south, and Las Palmas de Gran Canaria and Santa Cruz de Tenerife in the Canary Islands.

In the mid-1980s, the fishing fleet numbered between 13,800 and 17,500 vessels, most of which were old and small. Deep-sea vessels numbered about 2,000. Spain's 100,000 fishermen made up one-third of all European Community manpower in the fishing sector, and a further 700,000 Spanish jobs depended on fishing. Prior to its admission into the EC, the undisciplined behavior of Spanish fishermen was a constant problem for the government and for other European countries. Spanish vessels were frequently charged with fishing violations in the Atlantic and the North Sea. Entry into the EC brought access to most of its waters, but it also meant catches would be sharply restricted until 1995.

== See also ==
- Spanish cuisine
- Economy of Spain
- Rights of migrant agricultural workers
