= Larraya =

- Council
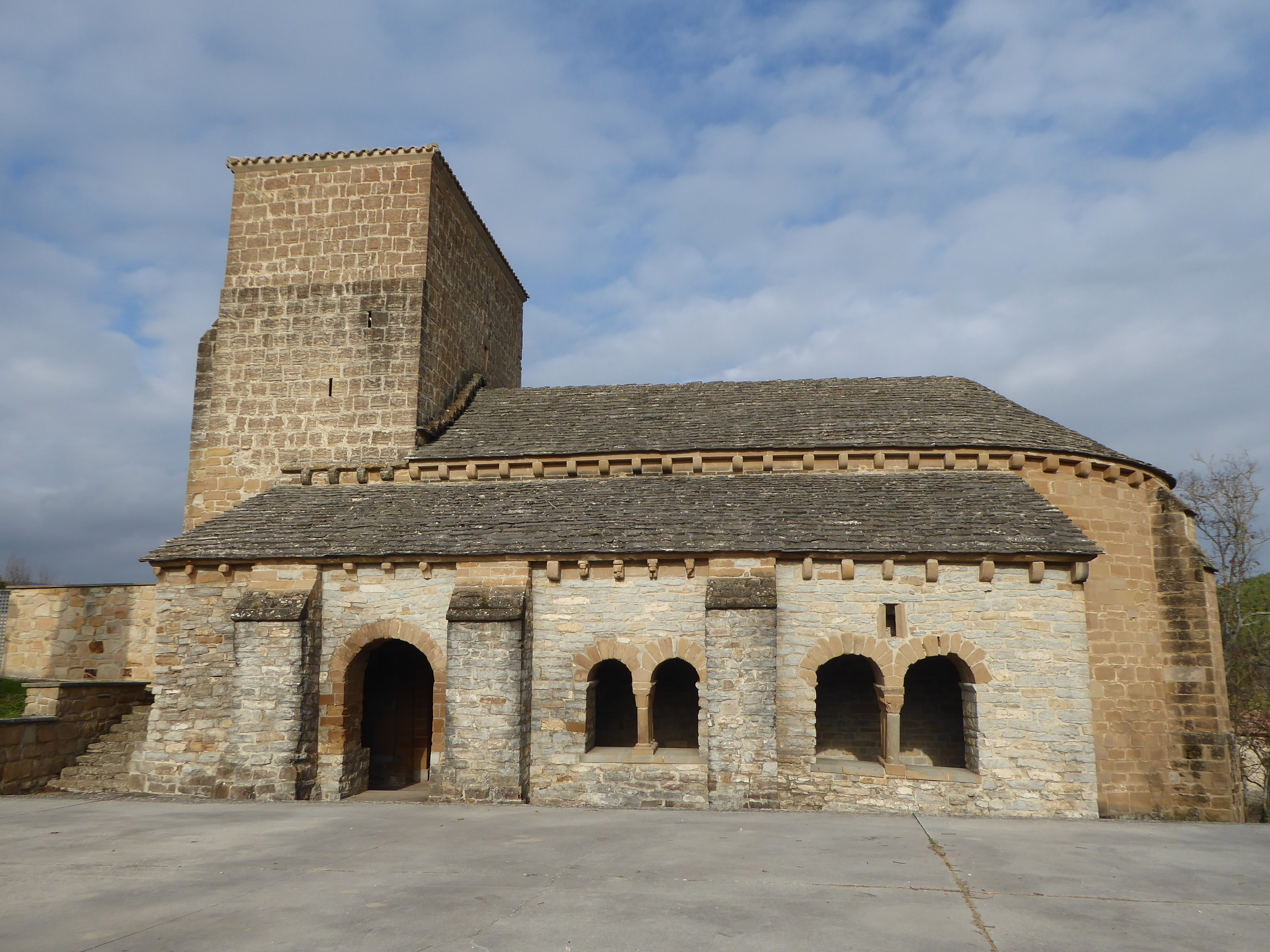

- Location within Navarre Location within Spain
- Coordinates: 42°46′36″N 1°45′50″W
- Country: Spain
- Community: Navarre
- Province: Navarre
- Municipality: Cizur
- Elevation: 411 m (1,348 ft)

Population
  - Total: 55

Larraya is a locality and council located in the municipality of Cizur, in Navarre province, Spain, Spain. As of 2020, it has a population of 55.

== Geography ==
Larraya is located 11km west-southwest of Pamplona.
