= Cizur Menor =

- Council
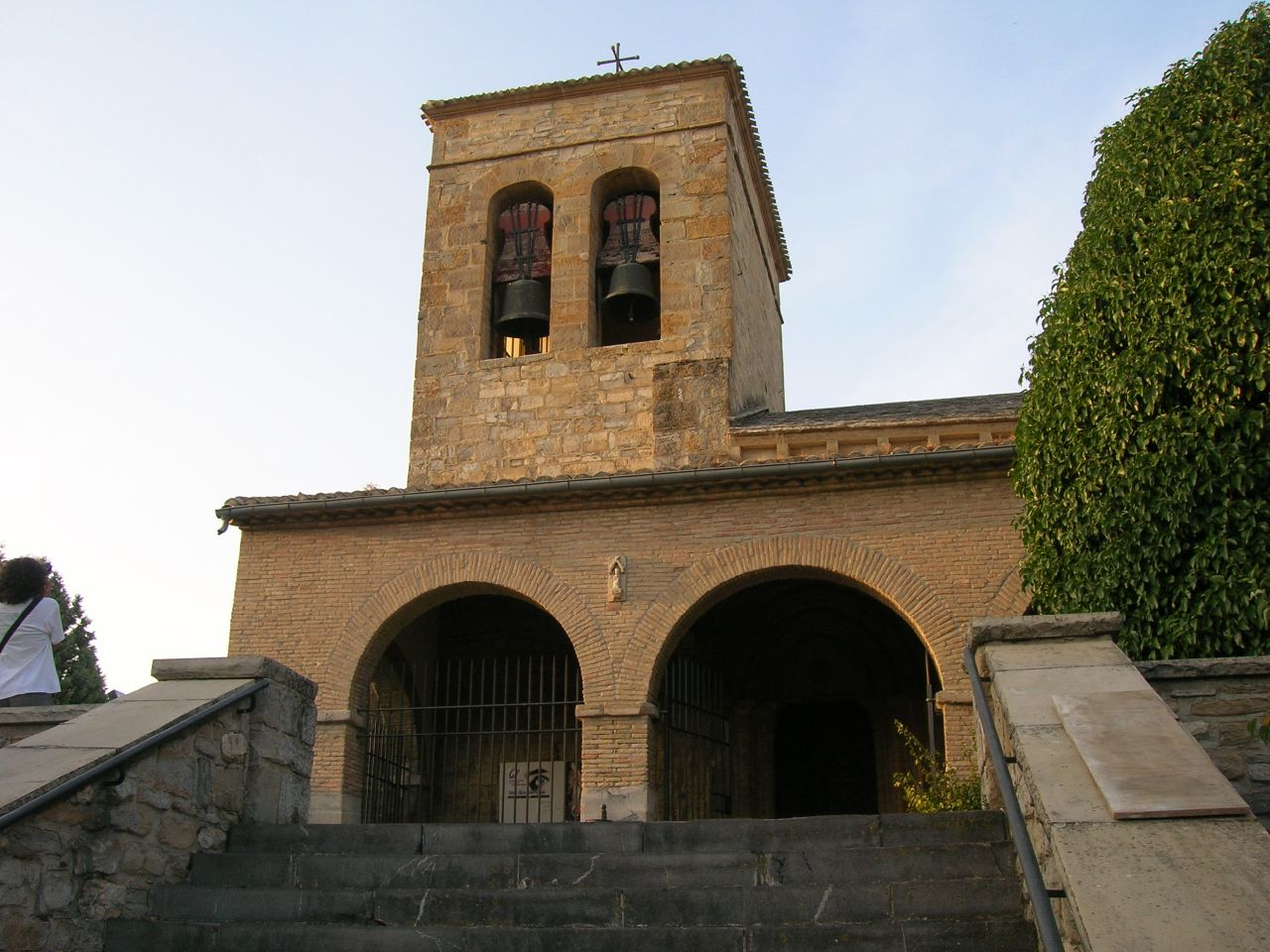

- Location within Navarre Location within Spain
- Coordinates: 42°47′17″N 1°40′38″W
- Country: Spain
- Community: Navarre
- Province: Navarre
- Municipality: Cizur
- Elevation: 467 m (1,532 ft)

Population
  - Total: 2,498

Cizur Menor is a locality and council located in the municipality of Cizur, in the province of Navarre, Spain. As of 2020, it has a population of 2498.

== Geography ==
Cizur Menor is located 5km south-southwest of Pamplona.
