= Muru-Astráin =

- Council
- Location within Navarre Location within Spain
- Coordinates: 42°45′58″N 1°44′30″W
- Country: Spain
- Community: Navarre
- Province: Navarre
- Municipality: Cizur
- Elevation: 499 m (1,637 ft)

Population
  - Total: 75

Muru-Astráin is a locality and council located in the municipality of Cizur, in Navarre province, Spain, Spain. As of 2020, it has a population of 75.

== Geography ==
Muru-Astráin is located 12km southwest of Pamplona.
