= Gaspar Zarrías =

Gaspar Zarrias
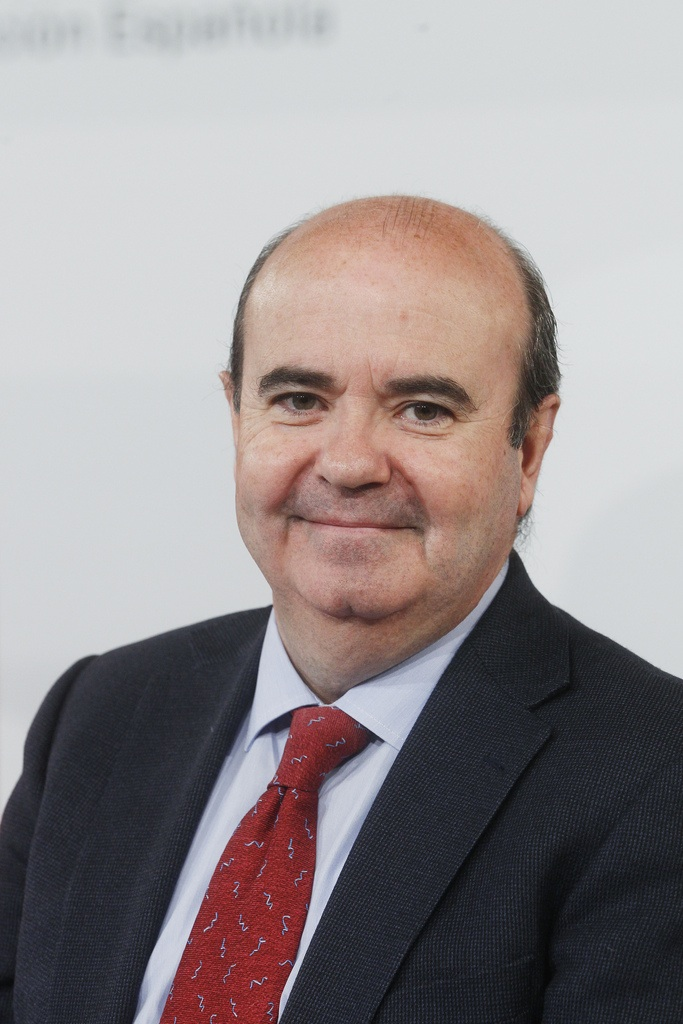

8th Secretary of State for Territorial Administrations
- In office 25 April 2009 – 24 December 2011
- Monarch: Juan Carlos I
- Prime Minister: José Luis Rodríguez Zapatero
- Preceded by: Fernando Puig de la Bellacasa
- Succeeded by: Antonio Bateta

President of the Regional Government of Andalusia Acting
- In office 7 April 2009 – 23 April 2009
- Monarch: Juan Carlos I
- Preceded by: Manuel Chaves González
- Succeeded by: José Antonio Griñán

Personal details
- Born: 30 April 1955 (age 70) Madrid, Spain
- Party: PSOE

Gaspar Zarrías Arevalo (born 30 April 1955) is a Spanish lawyer, politician and member of the Spanish Socialist Workers' Party (PSOE), which he joined in 1972.

Zarrias served as the interim President of the Regional Government of Andalusia from 7 April 2009, to 23 April 2009. He has served as the President's Office Minister for the Parliament of Andalusia and a member of the Organizing Committee of the Mediterranean Games of Almeria (COJMA). He has served as the Secretario de Ciudades y Política Municipal del PSOE, a leading position within the PSOE, since February 2012.

He previously served as a Councillor of Cazalilla (Jaén). He is involved in ERE corruption scandal since 2016.
