= Conference of Presidents (Spain) =

Political body in Spain

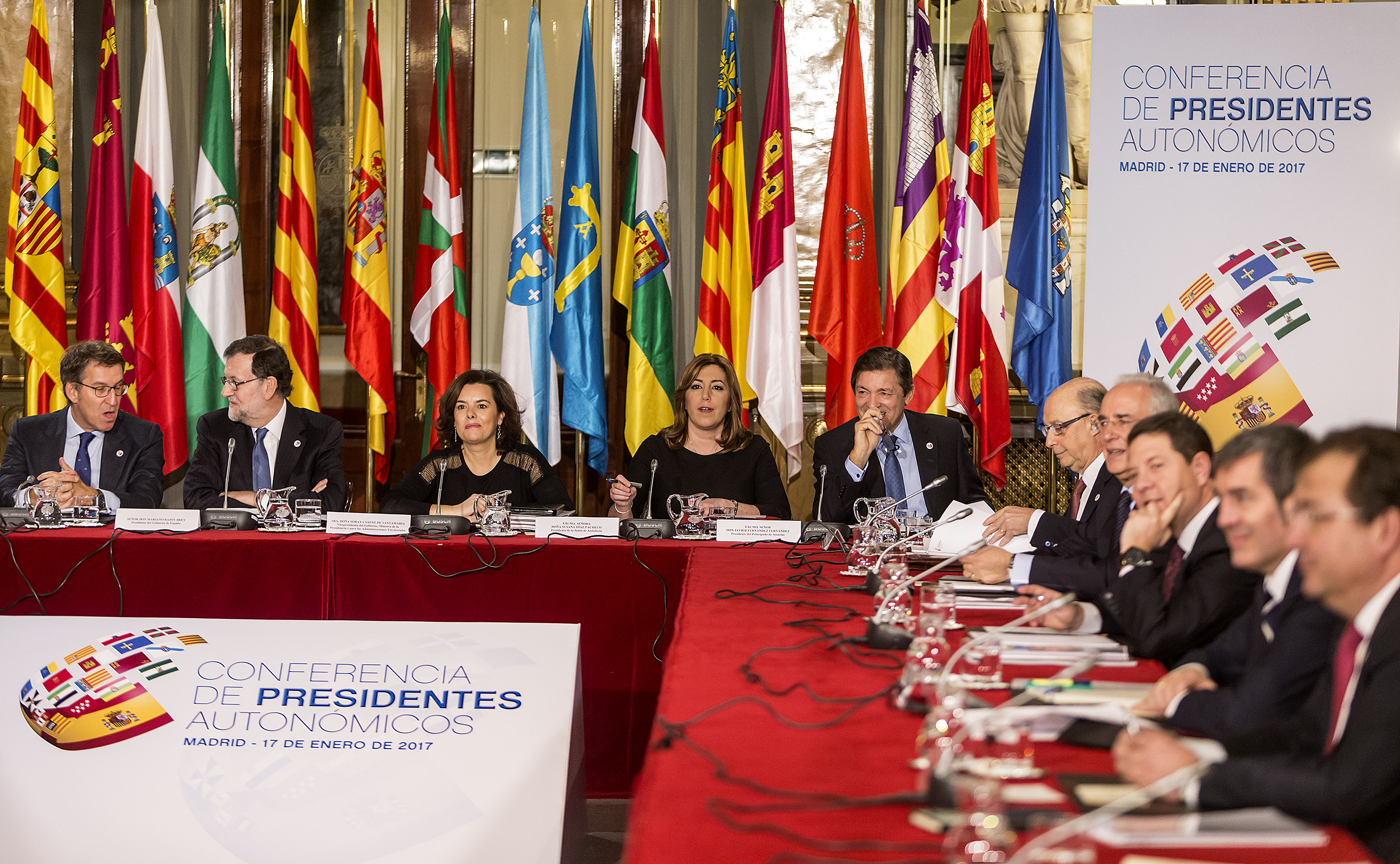
Conference of Presidents on 17 January 2017

The Conference of Presidents is the highest-level political body for cooperation between the Government of Spain, the autonomous communities and the cities of Ceuta and Melilla. It is the highest of Spain’s multilateral cooperation bodies. It has no constitutional or statutory basis. It is chaired by the Prime Minister (in Spanish, President of the Government), the 17 presidents of the autonomous communities and the 2 mayors-president of the autonomous cities of Ceuta and Melilla. A first meeting under the presidency of Felipe González in 1990 can be considered precedent-setting.

This is a common cooperation body in politically decentralised countries. top-level political meetings like this, with similar names, are also held in countries such as Germany, Austria, Switzerland, Italy and Canada. At the end of the XX century and the beginning of the XXI, it has assumed great importance as a driving force in the development of the so-called cooperative federalism, fundamentally in Germany and Austria.

In all these countries, the Conference of Presidents is institutionalized, either through agreements that regulate aspects relating to the functioning and contents of the meetings (in the case of Switzerland or Italy), or through the recognition of a political practice by habit, which is inherent in the cooperative operation of the state (Germany, Austria or Canada).

== History ==
The creation of the Conference of Presidents was announced by the President of the Government, José Luis Rodríguez Zapatero, in its inaugural meeting and was established on October 28, 2004. Given its nature and political level, its scope of action is open and its purpose is discussing and establish agreements on matters of special relevance to the autonomous system.

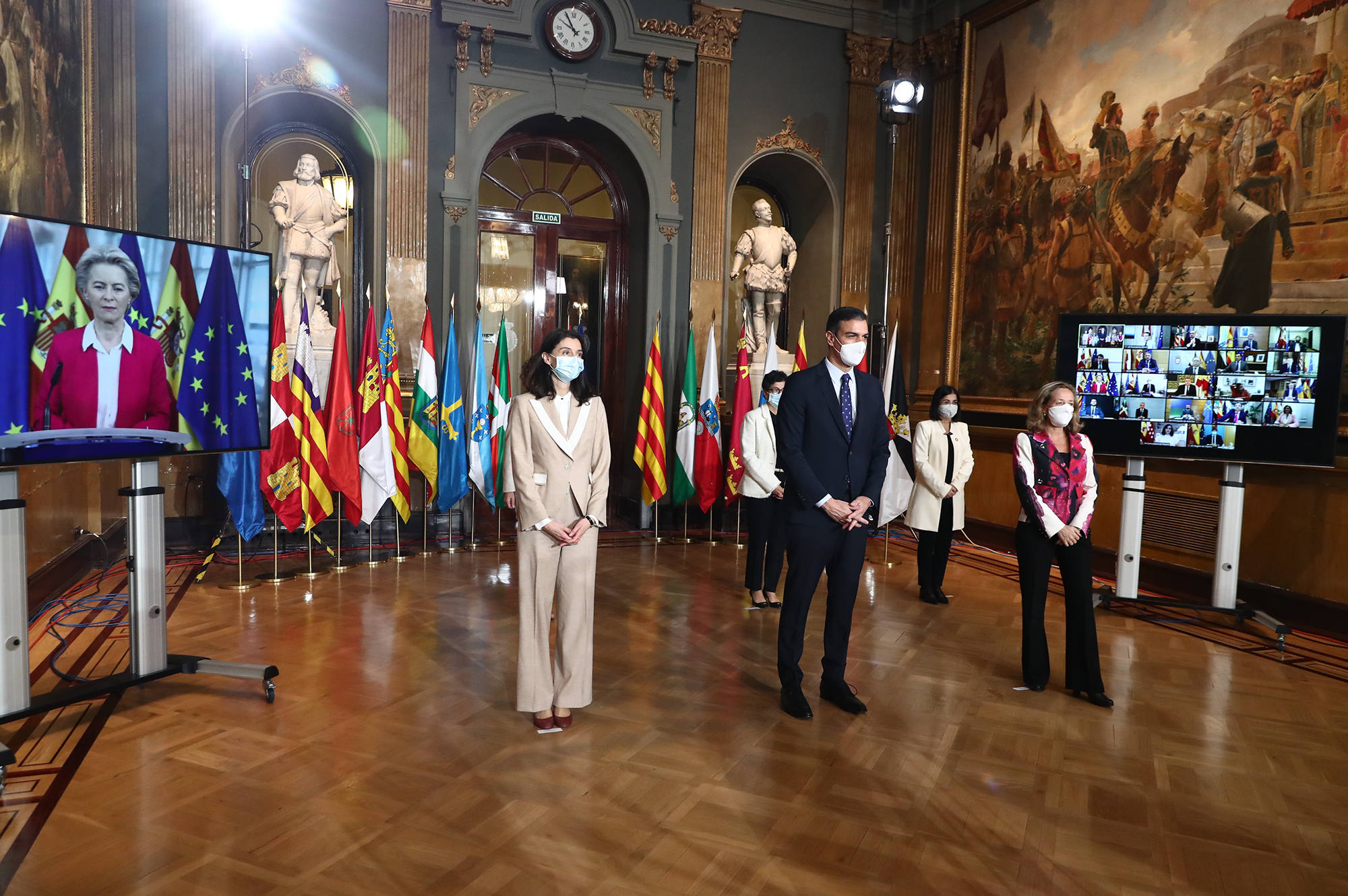
Conference of Presidents on October 26, 2020. (Teleconference)

Its functioning is flexible and its decisions are based on the principle of the agreement of the participants, in practice it is a merely consultative body of the Central Government with the autonomous communities and cities.The Conference of Presidents, in its first editions, was held with irregular periodicity, and always at the proposal of the Government of the Nation. Starting with the V Conference of Presidents, held on December 14, 2009, the Government approved a regulation establishing that the conferences would be held on an annual basis, although it didn’t finally happen. Thus, Zapatero's first government held meetings on 28 October 2004, 10 September 2005 and 11 January 2007. During Zapatero's second government, only one conference was held, on 14 December 2009. Mariano Rajoy held only one conference during his first term, on 2 October 2012. In January 2017, during his second term, the second conference was held with Rajoy at the helm.

The prime minister, Pedro Sánchez was the one who convened the most conferences, up to twenty between 2020 and 2022, many of them due to the COVID-19 pandemic. In fact since the seventh conference, most of the meetings held between 2020 and 2021 were teleconferences.

== Composition ==
Number	Date	Location	Prime Minister	Agenda
1st	28 October 2004	Palace of the Senate (Madrid, Madrid)	José Luis Rodríguez Zapatero	List: He discussed the institutionalisation of the Conference, the development of the participation of the autonomous communities in European Community Affairs and the analysis of the financing of health care.
2nd	10 Septiembre 2005	Palace of the Senate (Madrid, Madrid)	José Luis Rodríguez Zapatero	List: The issue of health care financing was discussed. The total contribution of the Government was initially set at 3,042.4 million euros for 2006 and 3,142.4 million euros for 2007.
3rd	11 January 2007	Palace of the Senate (Madrid, Madrid)	José Luis Rodríguez Zapatero	List: Topics such as Research, Technological Development and Innovation (R&D&I) were discussed in order to adopt a joint document, an agreement was reached for the creation of the Sectoral Conferences on Water and Immigration, and a Working Group was created for the Preparation of the Regulations of the Conference of Presidents.
4th	14 December 2009	Palace of the Senate (Madrid, Madrid)	José Luis Rodríguez Zapatero	List: The Internal Rules of the Conference of Presidents were approved, the priority issues to be developed in the Spanish Presidency of the Council of the European Union for 2010 were agreed upon, Gender violence and the need to promote instruments to combat it were discussed, and Employment, Sustainable economy, and Agriculture, Livestock, Fishing and Hydraulic Policy were debated.
5th	2 October 2012	Palace of the Senate (Madrid, Madrid)	Mariano Rajoy Brey	List: It dealt with Fiscal Stability, Economic and Labor Situation in Spain.
6th	17 January 2017	Palace of the Senate (Madrid, Madrid)	Mariano Rajoy Brey	List: Topics discussed included employment policies, the development of the principle of cooperation for the exercise of the powers of the different Administrations in matters of Civil Protection, the National Strategy to Face the Demographic Challenge, the Social and Political Pact for Education, the development and application of the Law to Guarantee the Unity of the Market, Digital Administration and Public Employment, the promotion of the Social Card, mechanisms for the Protection of Vulnerable Consumers of Electric Energy, the sustainability of the Welfare State and Reform of the Financing System and the development of the participation of the autonomous communities in the Affairs of the European Union. In addition, the Regulations of the Conference of Presidents were modified and agreements were reached on the Pact against Gender Violence.
7th	15 March 2020	Extraordinary meetings by teleconference due to the COVID-19 pandemic	Pedro Sánchez Pérez-Castejón	List: Between March and June 2020, the President of the Government, Pedro Sánchez, convened the Conference on fourteen occasions. All of them were held by videoconference and discussed issues related to the coronavirus pandemic affecting Spain and the measures of the Government of the Nation after the declaration of the state of alarm.
8th	22 March 2020	Extraordinary meetings by teleconference due to the COVID-19 pandemic	Pedro Sánchez Pérez-Castejón	List: Between March and June 2020, the President of the Government, Pedro Sánchez, convened the Conference on fourteen occasions. All of them were held by videoconference and discussed issues related to the coronavirus pandemic affecting Spain and the measures of the Government of the Nation after the declaration of the state of alarm.
9th	29 March 2020	Extraordinary meetings by teleconference due to the COVID-19 pandemic	Pedro Sánchez Pérez-Castejón	List: Between March and June 2020, the President of the Government, Pedro Sánchez, convened the Conference on fourteen occasions. All of them were held by videoconference and discussed issues related to the coronavirus pandemic affecting Spain and the measures of the Government of the Nation after the declaration of the state of alarm.
10th	5 April 2020	Extraordinary meetings by teleconference due to the COVID-19 pandemic	Pedro Sánchez Pérez-Castejón	List: Between March and June 2020, the President of the Government, Pedro Sánchez, convened the Conference on fourteen occasions. All of them were held by videoconference and discussed issues related to the coronavirus pandemic affecting Spain and the measures of the Government of the Nation after the declaration of the state of alarm.
11th	12 April 2020	Extraordinary meetings by teleconference due to the COVID-19 pandemic	Pedro Sánchez Pérez-Castejón	List: Between March and June 2020, the President of the Government, Pedro Sánchez, convened the Conference on fourteen occasions. All of them were held by videoconference and discussed issues related to the coronavirus pandemic affecting Spain and the measures of the Government of the Nation after the declaration of the state of alarm.
12th	19 April 2020	Extraordinary meetings by teleconference due to the COVID-19 pandemic	Pedro Sánchez Pérez-Castejón	List: Between March and June 2020, the President of the Government, Pedro Sánchez, convened the Conference on fourteen occasions. All of them were held by videoconference and discussed issues related to the coronavirus pandemic affecting Spain and the measures of the Government of the Nation after the declaration of the state of alarm.
13th	26 April 2020	Extraordinary meetings by teleconference due to the COVID-19 pandemic	Pedro Sánchez Pérez-Castejón	List: Between March and June 2020, the President of the Government, Pedro Sánchez, convened the Conference on fourteen occasions. All of them were held by videoconference and discussed issues related to the coronavirus pandemic affecting Spain and the measures of the Government of the Nation after the declaration of the state of alarm.
14th	3 May 2020	Extraordinary meetings by teleconference due to the COVID-19 pandemic	Pedro Sánchez Pérez-Castejón	List: Between March and June 2020, the President of the Government, Pedro Sánchez, convened the Conference on fourteen occasions. All of them were held by videoconference and discussed issues related to the coronavirus pandemic affecting Spain and the measures of the Government of the Nation after the declaration of the state of alarm.
15th	10 May 2020	Extraordinary meetings by teleconference due to the COVID-19 pandemic	Pedro Sánchez Pérez-Castejón	List: Between March and June 2020, the President of the Government, Pedro Sánchez, convened the Conference on fourteen occasions. All of them were held by videoconference and discussed issues related to the coronavirus pandemic affecting Spain and the measures of the Government of the Nation after the declaration of the state of alarm.
16th	17 May 2020	Extraordinary meetings by teleconference due to the COVID-19 pandemic	Pedro Sánchez Pérez-Castejón	List: Between March and June 2020, the President of the Government, Pedro Sánchez, convened the Conference on fourteen occasions. All of them were held by videoconference and discussed issues related to the coronavirus pandemic affecting Spain and the measures of the Government of the Nation after the declaration of the state of alarm.
17th	24 May 2020	Extraordinary meetings by teleconference due to the COVID-19 pandemic	Pedro Sánchez Pérez-Castejón	List: Between March and June 2020, the President of the Government, Pedro Sánchez, convened the Conference on fourteen occasions. All of them were held by videoconference and discussed issues related to the coronavirus pandemic affecting Spain and the measures of the Government of the Nation after the declaration of the state of alarm.
18th	31 May 2020	Extraordinary meetings by teleconference due to the COVID-19 pandemic	Pedro Sánchez Pérez-Castejón	List: Between March and June 2020, the President of the Government, Pedro Sánchez, convened the Conference on fourteen occasions. All of them were held by videoconference and discussed issues related to the coronavirus pandemic affecting Spain and the measures of the Government of the Nation after the declaration of the state of alarm.
19th	7 June 2020	Extraordinary meetings by teleconference due to the COVID-19 pandemic	Pedro Sánchez Pérez-Castejón	List: Between March and June 2020, the President of the Government, Pedro Sánchez, convened the Conference on fourteen occasions. All of them were held by videoconference and discussed issues related to the coronavirus pandemic affecting Spain and the measures of the Government of the Nation after the declaration of the state of alarm.
20th	14 June 2020	Extraordinary meetings by teleconference due to the COVID-19 pandemic	Pedro Sánchez Pérez-Castejón	List: Between March and June 2020, the President of the Government, Pedro Sánchez, convened the Conference on fourteen occasions. All of them were held by videoconference and discussed issues related to the coronavirus pandemic affecting Spain and the measures of the Government of the Nation after the declaration of the state of alarm.
21st	31 July 2020	San Millán de Yuso Monastery (San Millán de la Cogolla, La Rioja)	Pedro Sánchez Pérez-Castejón	List: Its opening was presided over by King Felipe VI of Spain. Matters related to the coronavirus outbreaks and the participation of the autonomous communities in the European recovery fund were discussed.
22nd	4 September 2020	Meeting by teleconference	Pedro Sánchez Pérez-Castejón	List: The return to the classroom was discussed while the COVID-19 pandemic lasts.
23rd	26 October 2020	Meeting by teleconference	Pedro Sánchez Pérez-Castejón	List: Conference attended by the President of the European Commission, Ursula von der Leyen. The criteria for the distribution of European funds that Spain will receive from the European Recovery Fund were discussed.
24th	30 July 2021	Saint Stephen Convent (Salamanca, Salamanca)	Pedro Sánchez Pérez-Castejón	List: Its opening was presided over by King Felipe VI. The meeting dealt with the management of European funds for recovery and the demographic challenge.
25th	22 December 2021	Meeting by teleconference	Pedro Sánchez Pérez-Castejón	List: Celebrated online from the Senate of Spain. It dealt with the advance of the Omicron variant of COVID-19 throughout the country
26th	13 March 2022	Benahoarita Archaeological Museum (Los Llanos de Aridane, Santa Cruz de Tenerife)	Pedro Sánchez Pérez-Castejón	List: Celebrated online from the Senate of Spain. It dealt with the advance of the Omicron variant of COVID-19 throughout the country. Finalmente se celebró el 13 de marzo en Los Llanos de Aridane, municipio de la isla de La Palma, unos meses después del fin de la erupción volcánica en Cumbre Vieja. La apertura fue presidida por el Rey y se trató la acogida de refugiados ucranianos, asuntos económicos y energéticos y gestión de fondos europeos.
27th	13 December 2024	Royal Palace of the Magdalena (Santander, Cantabria)	Pedro Sánchez Pérez-Castejón	List: The meeting discussed regional financing, migration and housing policies and human resources for the health system.
28th	6 June 2025	Royal Palace of Pedralbes (Barcelona, Catalonia)	Pedro Sánchez Pérez-Castejón	List: The meeting discussed regional financing, migration,housing crisis, human resources for the health system, energy and education.

== See also ==
- Executive federalism
