= Paternáin =

- Council
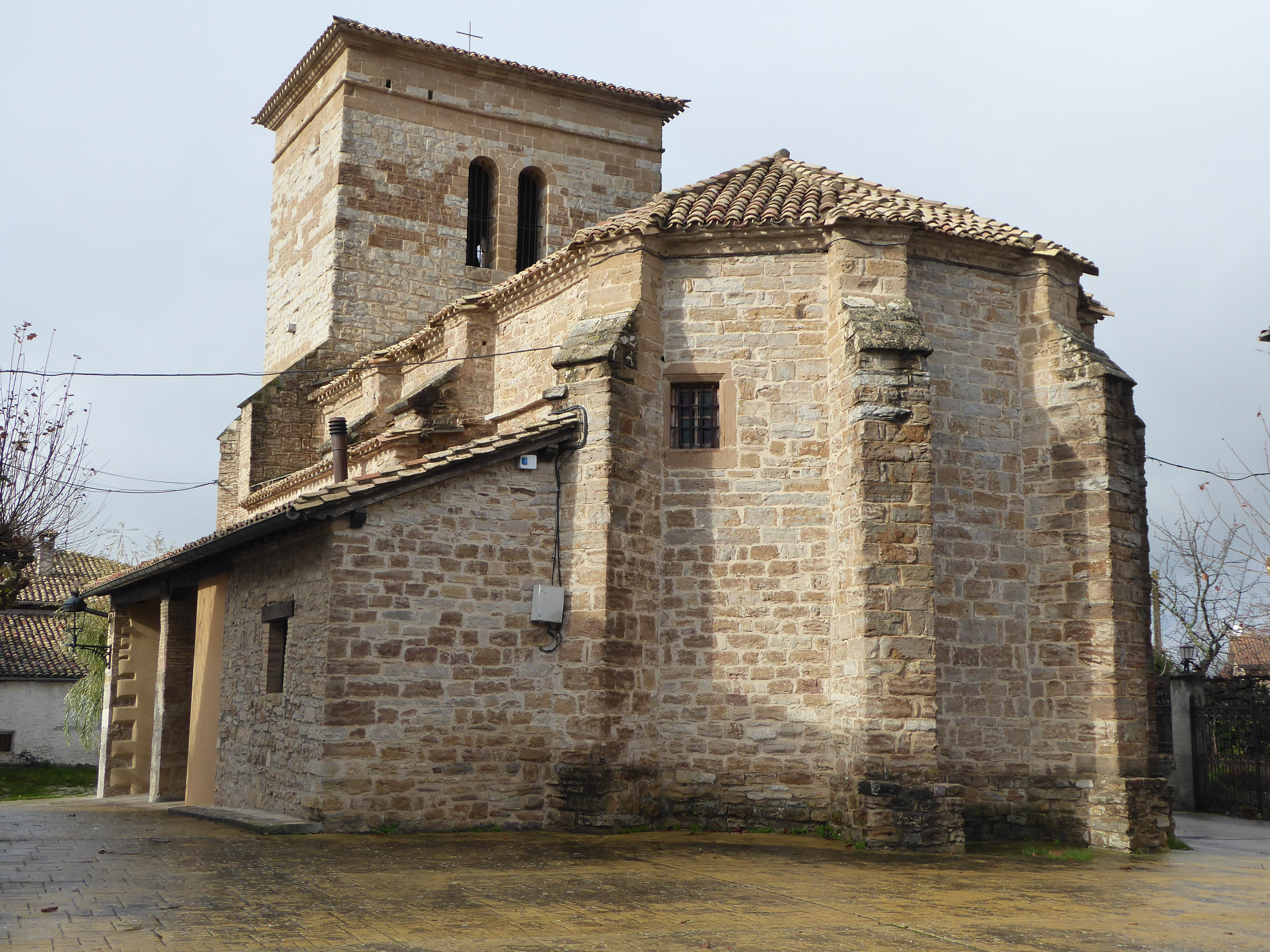

- Location within Navarre Location within Spain
- Coordinates: 42°47′4″N 1°44′42″W
- Country: Spain
- Community: Navarre
- Province: Navarre
- Municipality: Cizur
- Elevation: 439 m (1,440 ft)

Population
  - Total: 387

Paternáin is a locality and council located in the municipality of Cizur, in Navarre province, Spain. As of 2020, it has a population of 387.

== Geography ==
Paternáin is located 9km west-southwest of Pamplona.
