= Gazólaz =

Village and council in Navarre, Spain

Coordinates: 42°47′31″N 1°43′04″W

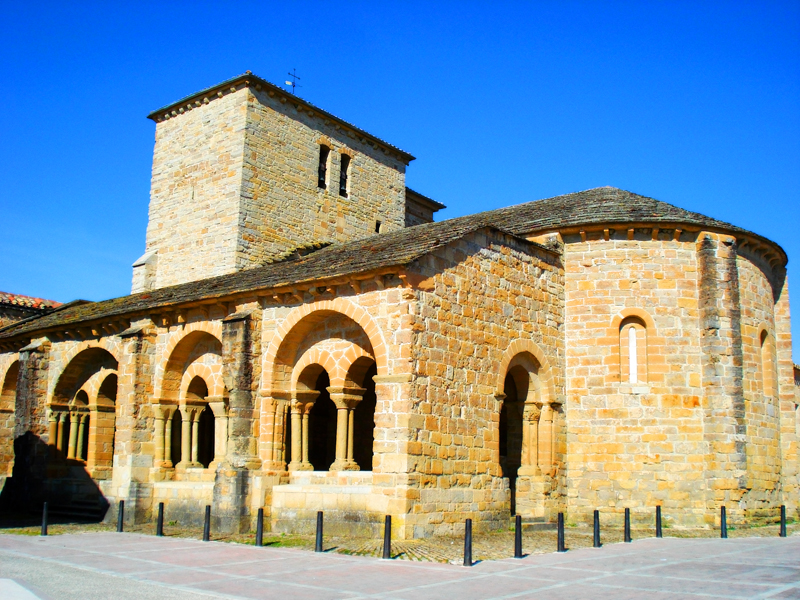
Iglesia de Nuestra Señora de la Purificación

Gazólaz is a village and council belonging to the municipality of Cendea de Cizur located in the province and autonomous community of Navarre (Navarra/Nafarroa), northern Spain. It is located in the middle of Navarre, in a rounded valley known as the Cuenca de Pamplona, some 6 km (4 mi) from the provincial capital, Pamplona. As of January 2009 INE census figures, Gazólaz has a population of 145 inhabitants.
