= Esparza, Navarre =

Municipality in Navarre, Spain

Coordinates: 42°51′18″N 1°05′55″W

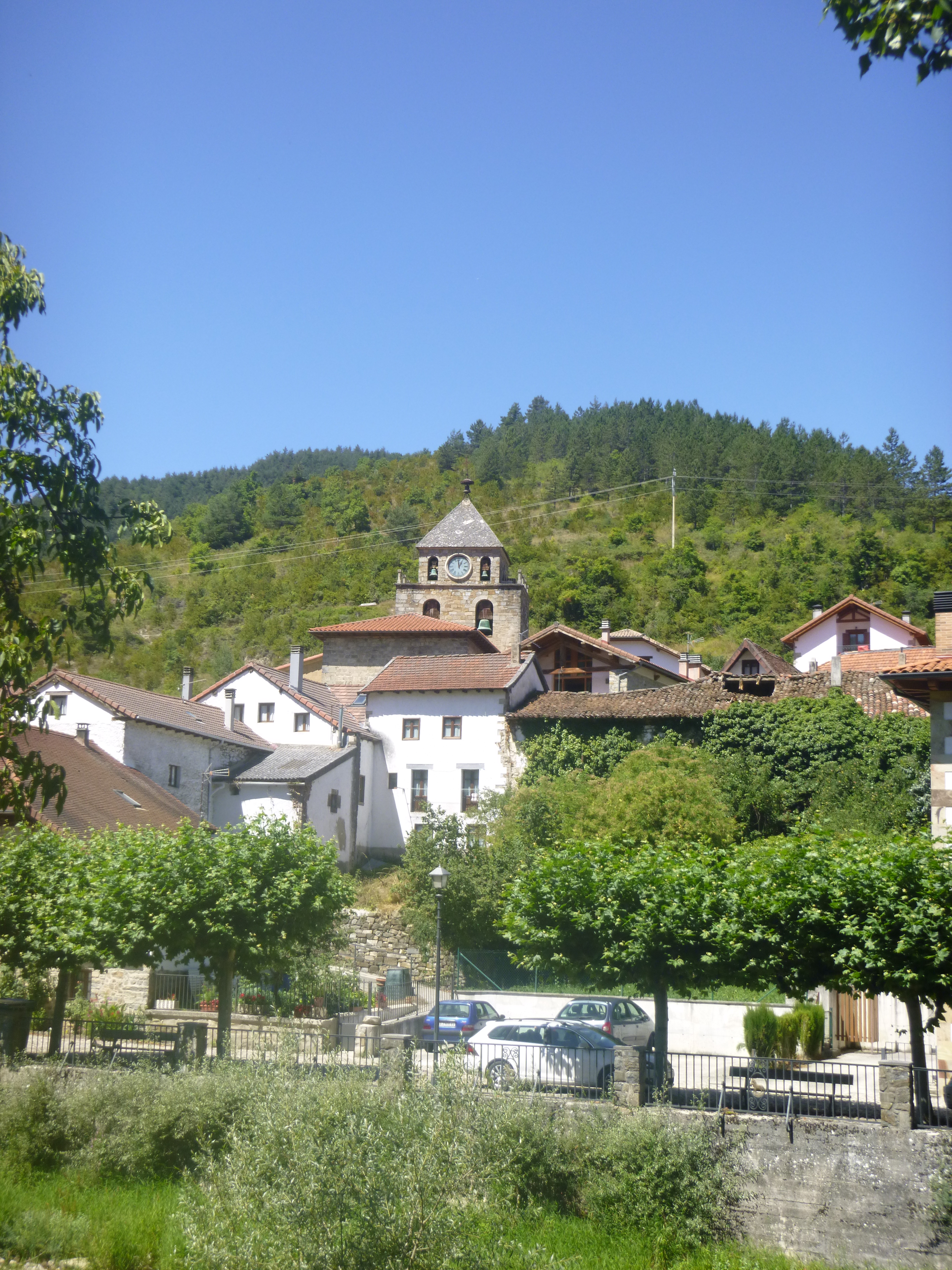

Esparza is a town and municipality located in the province and autonomous community of Navarre, northern Spain.
