= Zariquiegui =

- Council
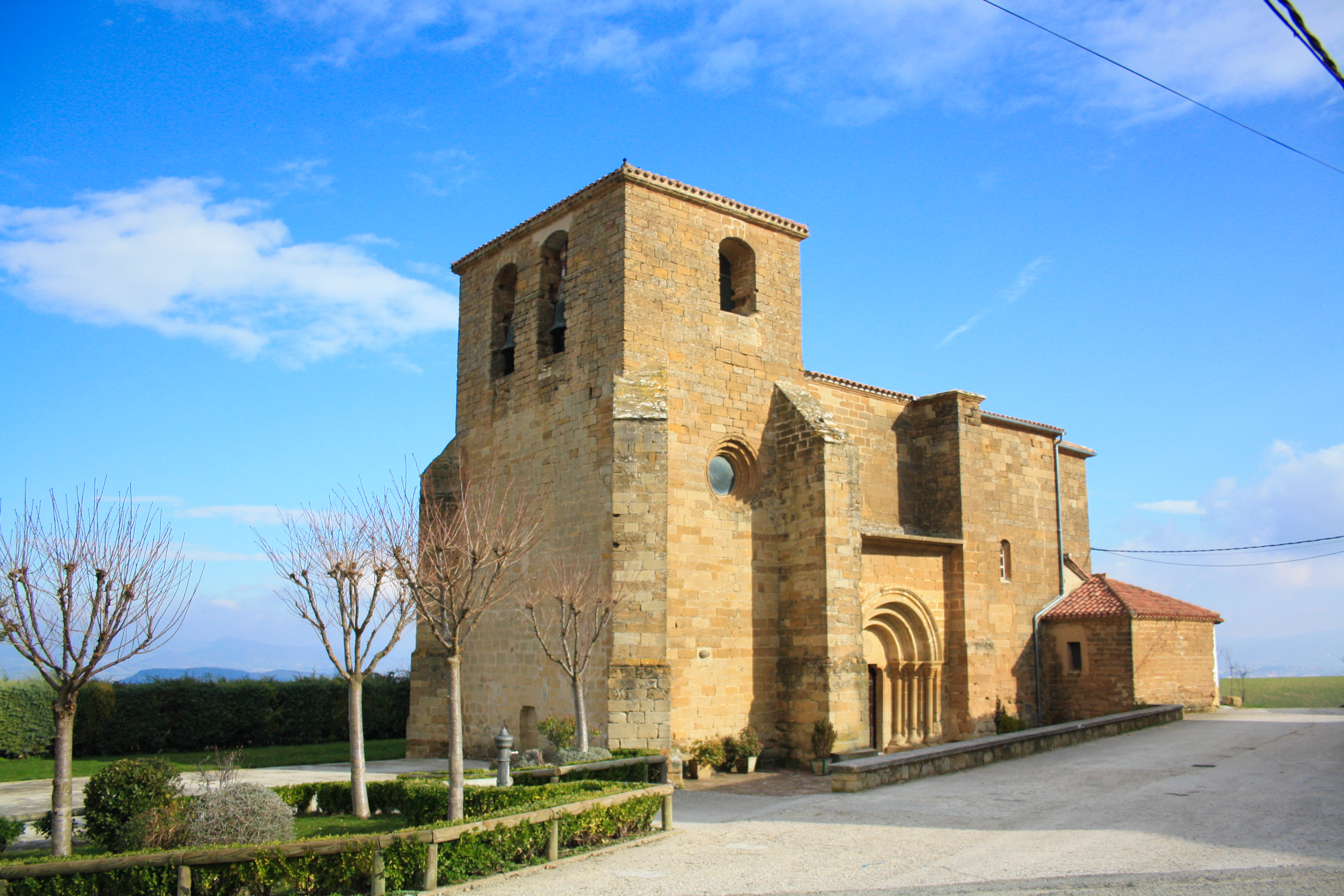

- Location within Navarre Location within Spain
- Coordinates: 42°44′53″N 1°43′24″W
- Country: Spain
- Community: Navarre
- Province: Navarre
- Municipality: Cizur
- Elevation: 623 m (2,044 ft)

Population
  - Total: 178

Zariquiegui is a locality and council located in the municipality of Cizur, in Navarre province, Spain. As of 2020, it has a population of 178.

== Geography ==
Zariquiegui is located 11km southwest of Pamplona.
