= Cizur =

Cizur Zizur
- Municipality
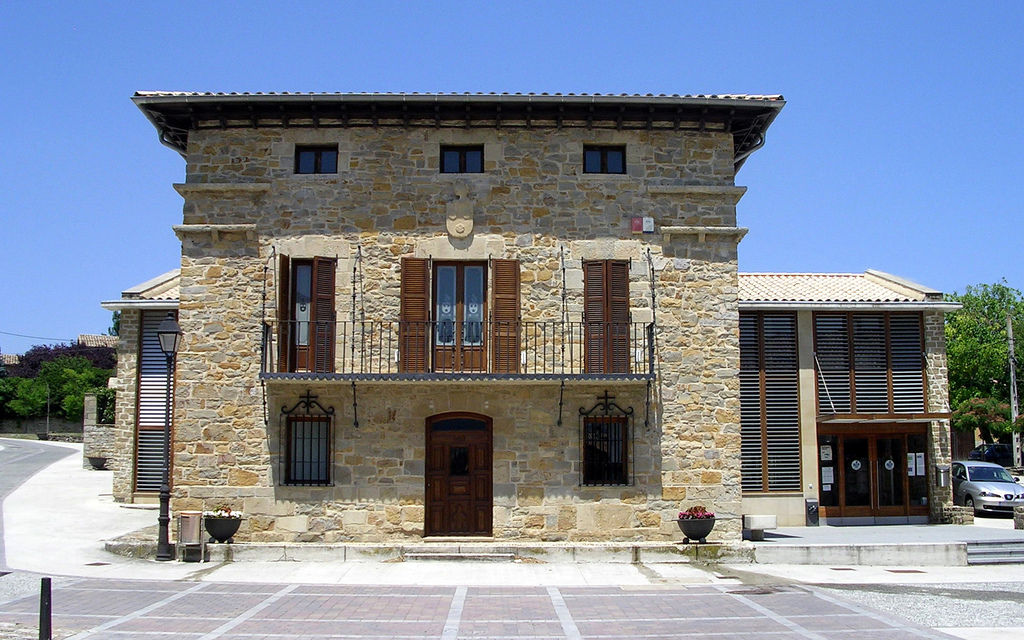
- Town hall of Cizur

- Coat of arms

- Location in Spain
- Coordinates: 42°46′31″N 1°43′4″W
- Country: Spain
- Autonomous community: Navarre
- Province: Navarre
- Eskualdea / Comarca: Cuenca de Pamplona

Government
  - Mayor: José Joaquín San Martín Murillo (UPN)

Area
  - Total: 46.473 km^{2} (17.943 sq mi)
- Elevation: 459 m (1,506 ft)

Population (2025-01-01)
  - Total: 3,949
  - Density: 84.97/km^{2} (220.1/sq mi)
- Time zone: UTC+1 (CET)
  - Summer (DST): UTC+2 (CEST (GMT +2))
- Postal code: 31190
- Area code: +34 (Spain) + 948 (Navarre)
- Website: Town Council

Cizur (Basque: Zizur) is a town and municipality located in the province and autonomous community of Navarre, northern Spain.

== Councils ==
The municipality is composed of 8 councils:

- Astráin / Asterain
- Cizur Menor / Zizur Txikia
- Gazólaz / Gatzolatz
- Larraya / Larraia
- Muru-Astráin / Muru Asterain
- Paternáin / Baternain
- Undiano / Undio
- Zariquiegui / Zarikiegi

3 populated places: Eriete, Guenduláin (Gendulain) and Sagüés (Sagues).
