= Sadar =

Sadar may refer to:

== Places ==
- Sadar, Prayagraj, a town and a nagar panchayat in Uttar Pradesh, India
- Sadar, Uttar Pradesh, a tehsil in Pratapgarh district
- Sadar, Hazaribagh (community development block), Jharkhand, India
- Sadar, Iran, a village in Hormozgan Province

== Other uses ==
- Sadar (festival), a buffalo festival in Hyderabad, India
- Sadar (river), Navarre, Spain
- El Sadar Stadium, Pamplona, Navarre, Spain
- Delhi Sadar (Lok Sabha constituency), a Lok Sabha constituency in Delhi, India
- Sadar North Baptist Association, a Baptist community in Tripura, India

== See also ==
- Sadar Hills, Manipur, India, a geographical area
- Sadar Bazaar (disambiguation)
- Sadr (disambiguation)
