= Central Market =

Central Market may refer to:

== Fresh food markets ==
- Adelaide Central Market, Australia
- Cardiff Central Market, Wales
- Central Market, Hong Kong
- Central Market, Casablanca, Morocco
- Riga Central Market, Latvia
- Central Market (Columbus, Ohio), United States
- Central Market, Kuala Lumpur, Malaysia
- Central Market (Lancaster), United States
- Central Market (Paramaribo), Suriname
- Central Market, Phnom Penh, Cambodia
- Central Market (Rostov-on-Don), Russia
- Central Market, Sabadell, Catalonia, Spain
- Central Market, Santiago, Chile
- Central Market (Tyumen), Russia
- Lajpat Nagar Central Market, Delhi

== Other uses ==
- Central Market (Texas), a gourmet grocery store chain
- Central Market, a 2009 album by Tyondai Braxton

== See also ==
- Mercado Central (disambiguation)
- Sadar Bazaar (disambiguation)
- Marketplace (disambiguation)
