= Sadar Bazaar (disambiguation) =

Saddar Bazaar or Sadar Bazaar or Sadar Bazar (lit. 'Central Bazaar' ;transl. Central Market – transl. Main Market) is a main market or bazaar in the cantonments of India and Pakistan and may specifically refer to:

- Sadar Bazaar, Agra, a shopping destination for tourists in Agra Cantonment, India
  - Sadar Bazar Stadium, sports stadium
- Sadar Bazaar, Delhi, a wholesale market in Delhi Cantonment, India
  - Sadar Bazar (Vidhan Sabha constituency), a legislative assembly constituency in Delhi, India
  - Sadar Bazar Cantonment metro station
  - Sadar Bazar railway station, a small railway station in Sadar Bazaar, Delhi
- Sadar Bazar Jhansi, a location in Jhansi Cantonment, India

== See also ==
- Sadar (disambiguation)
- Bazaar (disambiguation)
- Central market (disambiguation)
- Main Bazaar, shopping locality in Ooty, Tamil Nadu, India
