= Mercado Central =

Mercado Central is the Spanish term for Central Market, and can refer to:

- Mercado Central, Valencia, Spain
- Mercado Central de Santiago, Chile
- Mercado central de Pontevedra, Spain
- Mercado Central de Lima, Peru
- Mercado Central (TV series), a Spanish soap opera
