= Mercado central de Pontevedra =

Public market located in Pontevedra, Spain

Central Market of Pontevedra
- Mercado de Abastos de Pontevedra
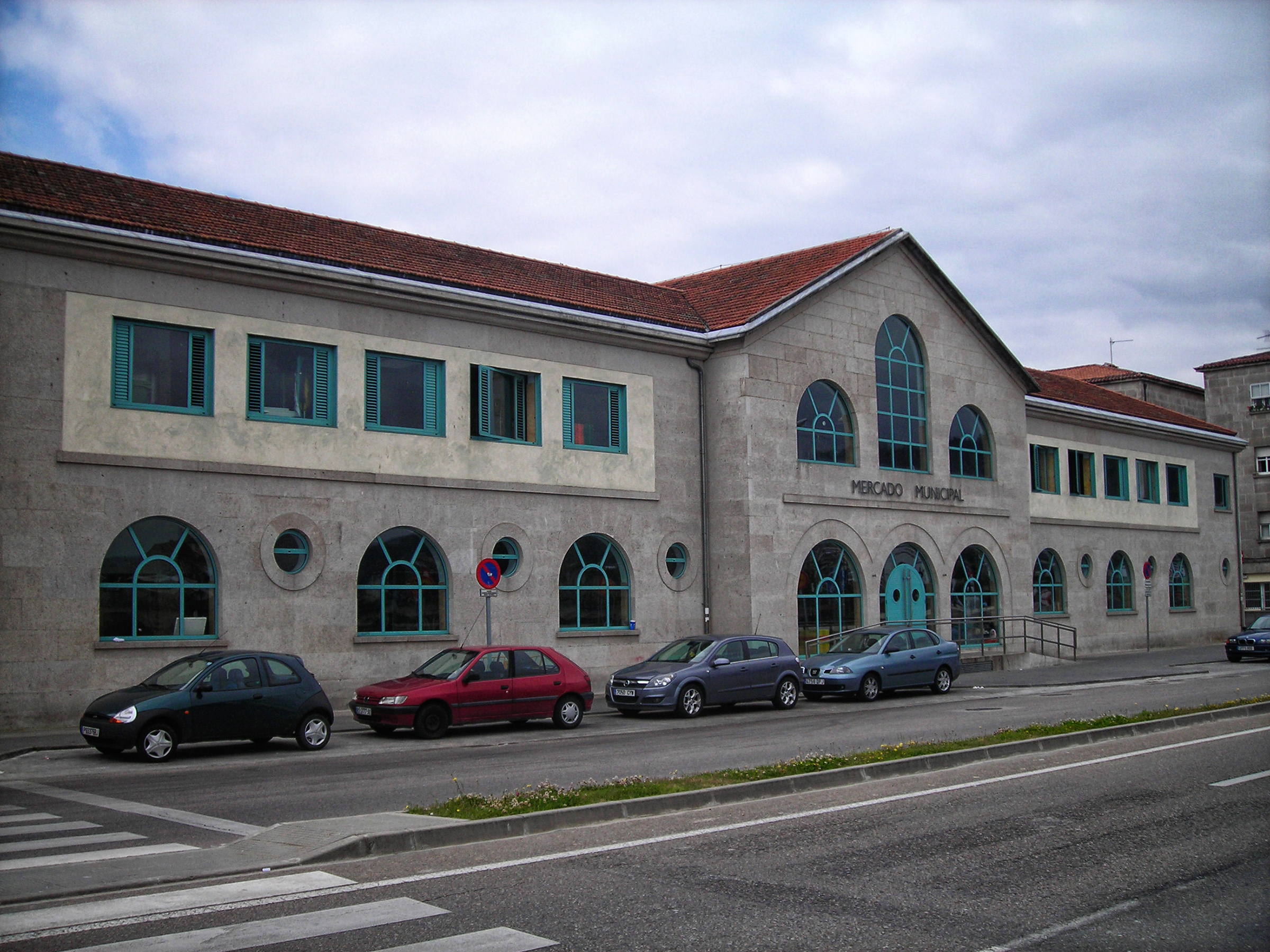
- North façade of the market
- Interactive map of the Central Market of Pontevedra area

General information
- Type: Covered Market
- Location: Pontevedra, Galicia, Spain
- Coordinates: 42°26′03.3″N 8°38′37.1″W
- Construction started: 1945
- Completed: 1948
- Opening: 20 January 1948
- Owner: City Council of Pontevedra

Technical details
- Floor count: 2

Design and construction
- Architect: Emilio Quiroga Losada

Website
- https://www.ponteabastos.com/

The Central Market of Pontevedra (or Municipal Market of Pontevedra) is a covered market located in Pontevedra, Spain. It is located at the north-eastern edge of the historic centre, close to the Burgo Bridge. It overlooks the banks of the Lérez river and was inaugurated in 1948.

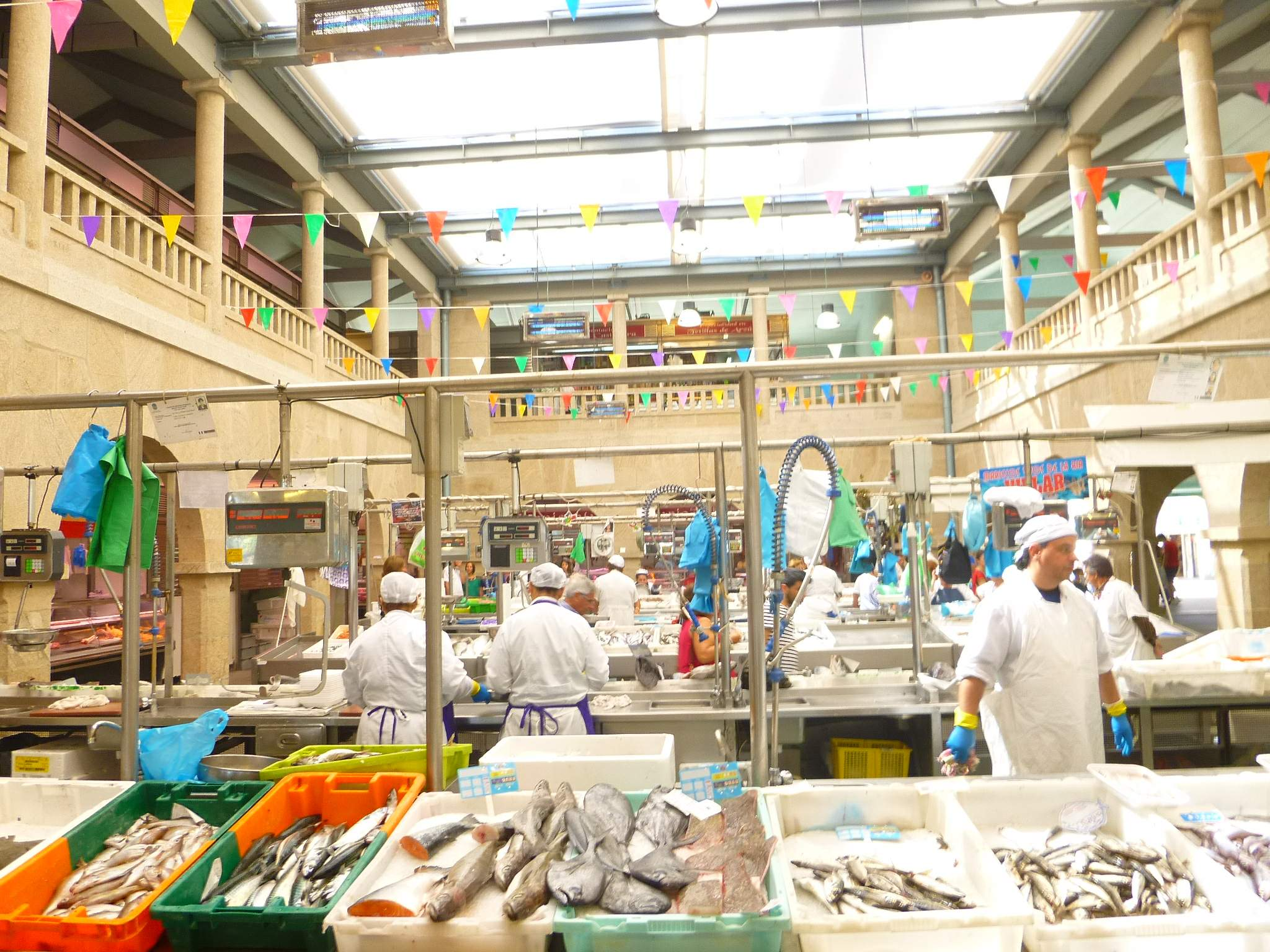
Inner courtyard.

== History ==
The medieval squares of the historic centre of Pontevedra were, since the Middle Ages, the place where different products were sold. In the Plaza de Teucro, products such as bread and milk were sold, in the Plaza de la Verdura, vegetables, fruit, chestnuts and fish, and in the Plaza de Méndez Núñez, chickens, among others.

In the 1880s, the city urgently needed a covered market for greater comfort and hygiene, as shown in the municipal minutes of 5 March 1884. In 1885, the project for a covered market was approved and entrusted to the municipal architect, Alejandro Sesmero. The new covered market was inaugurated on 15 August 1886 next to the Burgo Bridge, on the site of the old prison. It had a ground floor and a longitudinal facade along the Lérez river on the old embankment. There were marble counters and iron fans for meat. The market was covered with a mixed iron and wooden frame.

This market, covered by a metal roof, was demolished in the 1940s to build a new, larger market in Sierra Street, on the site of the city's old slaughterhouse. The design of the market project was presented in May 1942 by the architects Emilio Quiroga Losada and José Barreiro Vázquez and construction began in 1945. During the construction of the new market, fish sellers and farmers set up their stalls in individual boxes next to the Burgo Bridge and Valentín García Escudero Square. The city's new two-floor covered market, designed by the municipal architect Emilio Quiroga Losada, was inaugurated on 20 January 1948.

In the 1990s, it became clear that this 1948 covered market needed to be completely renovated to meet new needs. In 1999, a temporary market was built in front of the city's municipal sports pavilion, north of the Lérez River, and the 1948 market was dismantled stone by stone in 2000 to rebuild it completely renovated on the same site in Sierra Street. This renovation was carried out by the architect César Portela and the market was inaugurated on 10 October 2003. The complete renovation of the building was based on space and luminosity and included the construction of a two-floor underground car park.

The first floor of the market was refurbished in 2019 for the installation of a gastronomic area which was inaugurated on 22 August 2019 under the name Gastroespazo with different gastronomic stands dedicated to hake, octopus, mussels, chicken and traditional Galician cuisine, among others.

In October 2020, the market launched a website for the purchase of its products online, ponteabastos.com.

== Description ==
The market is a two-floor granite building, rectangular in plan and in the traditional Galician style with columns, arches and arcades. Its central body, to which two U-shaped bodies were added, was treated as a basilica. The two façades are made up of three semi-circular arches. The main facade is structured around three main arcades on the ground floor that give access to the building and five arcades on each side that house various small shops. On the upper floor, the central part of the façade has three large semi-circular windows, the largest of which is the central one, and rectangular windows framed by balconies on each side. The central body of both façades is crowned with pediments at the top and columns on the two central supports. The central arch is higher than the lateral ones. The building has two roofs with independent ridges.

On the north facade, the central part of the facade is framed by three semicircular windows on both sides, between which are four oeil-de-boeuf, and by windows without balconies on the first floor.

Inside, the main entrance leads to a large central stone staircase leading to the first floor. The main staircase ends in a balcony on the first floor and allows for a lower passageway with three arches, the central one larger, which facilitates the transition to the stalls. The interior is structured around two large central rectangular courtyards with balconies on the first floor and arcades on the ground floor.

The market had a total of 367 points of sale in 2014, and after the transformation of the first floor in 2019 into a gastronomic area, it has 214 stalls dedicated to the sale of fish and seafood and fruit and vegetables, 30 indoor stalls dedicated mainly to the sale of meat and 19 outdoor stalls under the arcades dedicated to the sale of clothing, newspapers or jewellery. There are also flower sellers on the ground floor of the market.

The market is also home to the Pontevedra fish auction, where fish and seafood auctions are held.

Since 2002, the market has had a two-floor underground car park which also serves the historic city centre with a total of 208 parking spaces.

== Culture ==
During the renovation of the market, the remains of a piece of the medieval city walls were discovered nearby in Sierra Street.

On 25 November 2009, the sculptural group "A moza das galiñas" by the artist Cuqui Piñeiro, representing a woman feeding four hens and a rooster, was inaugurated in front of the main entrance to the market in Sierra Street. The sculptural group is a tribute to Galician women and the market's vendors.

== Gallery ==
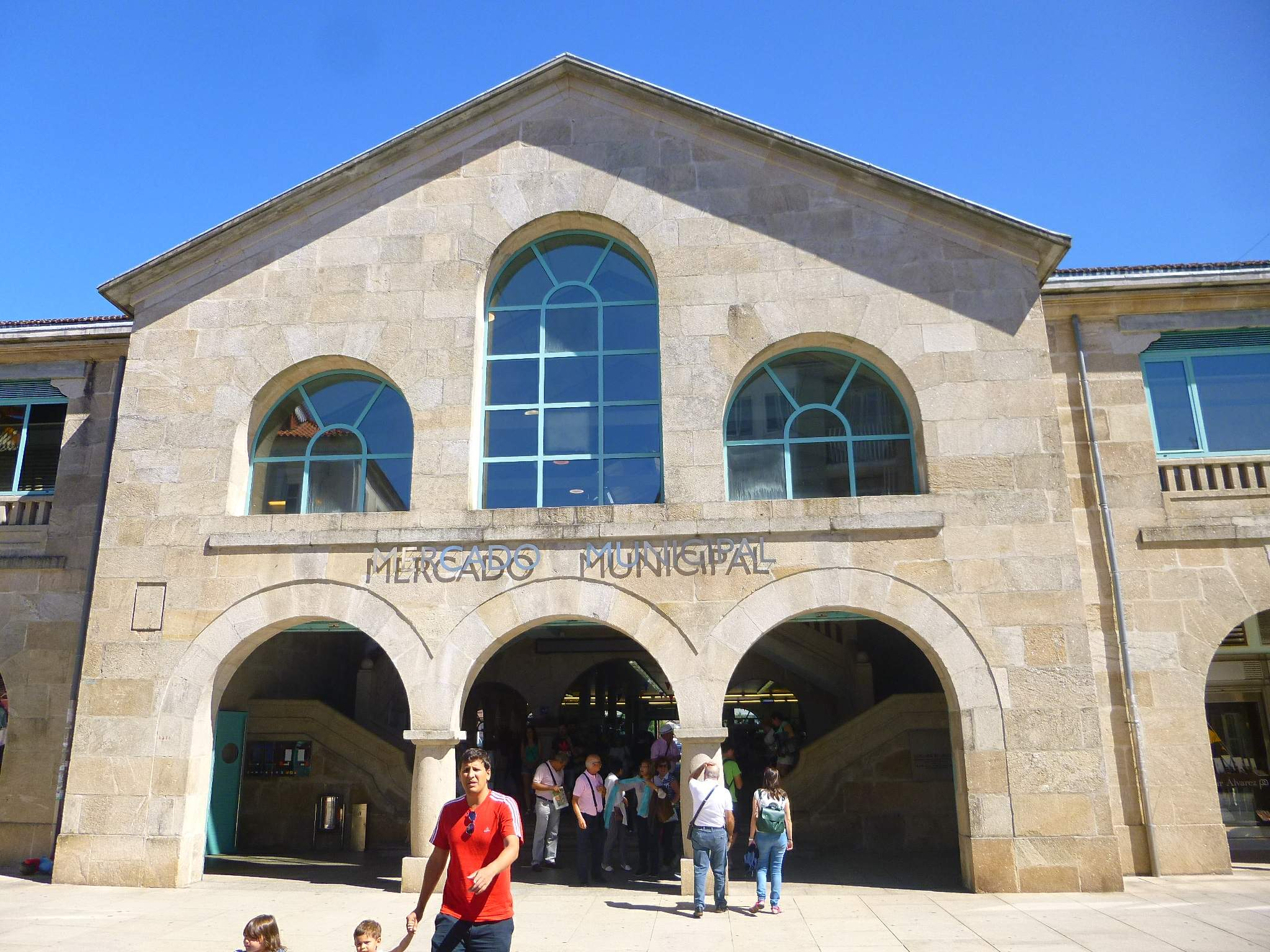
Central part of the main market façade.

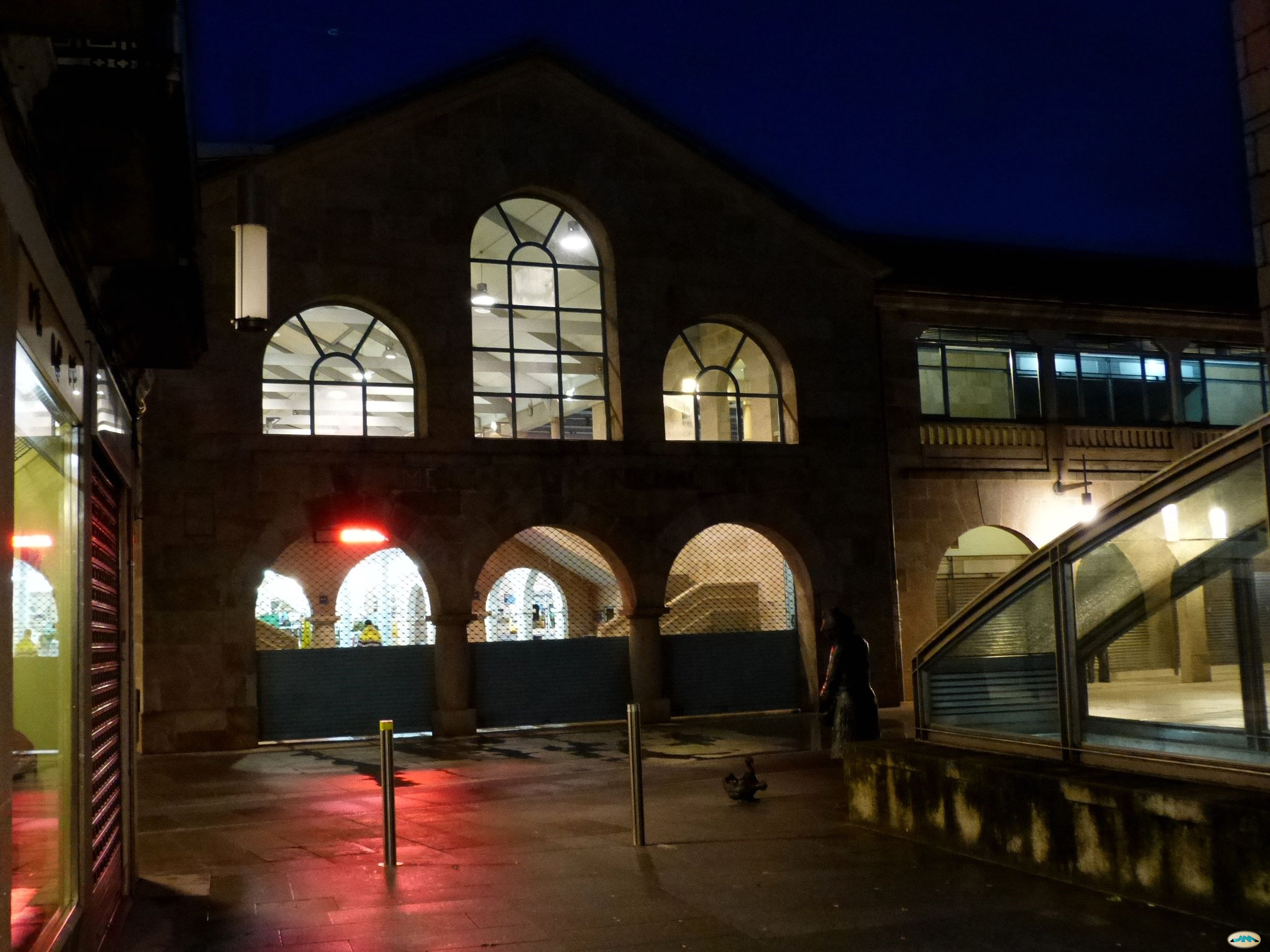
The market at night.

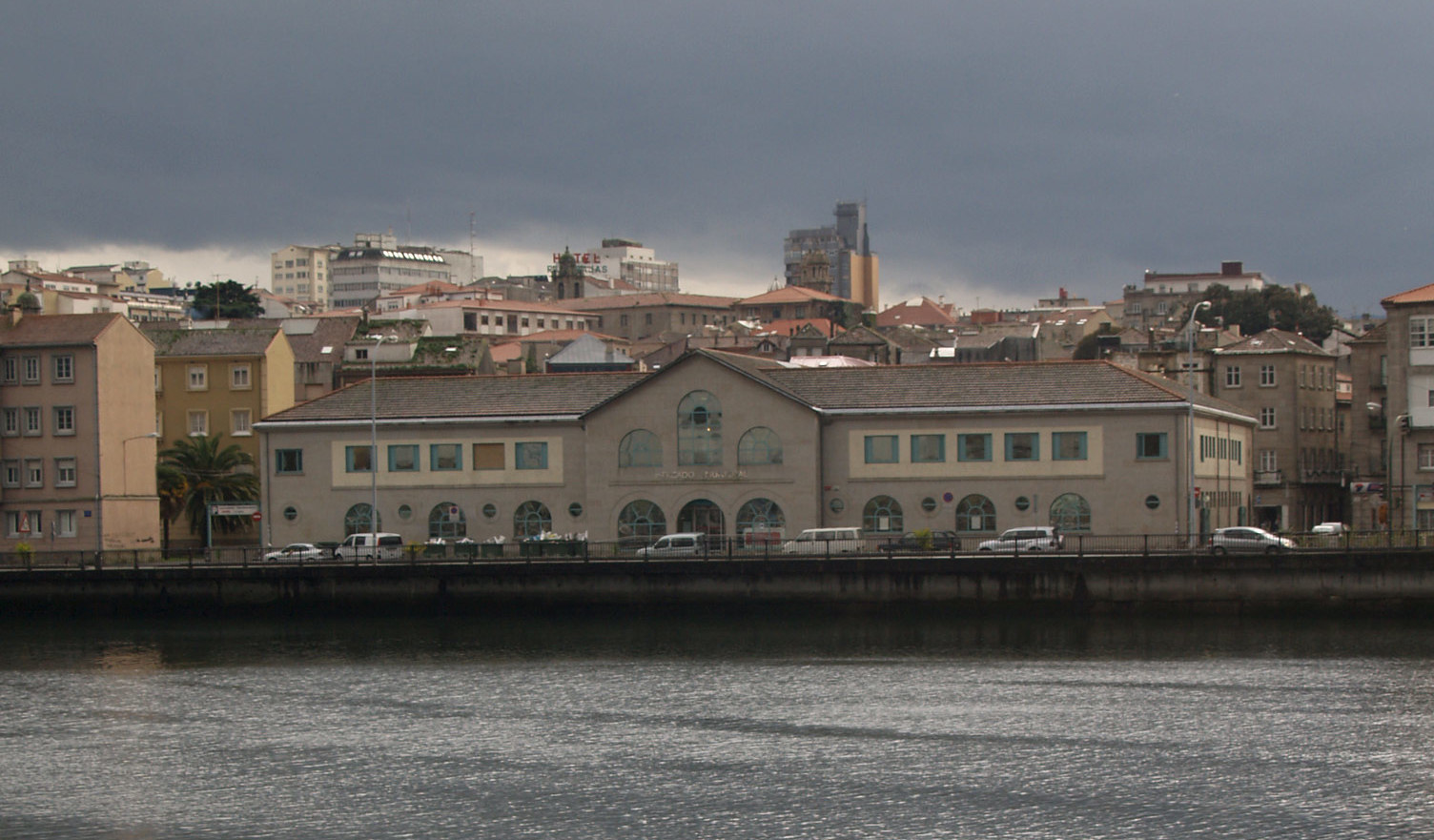
North side of the market.

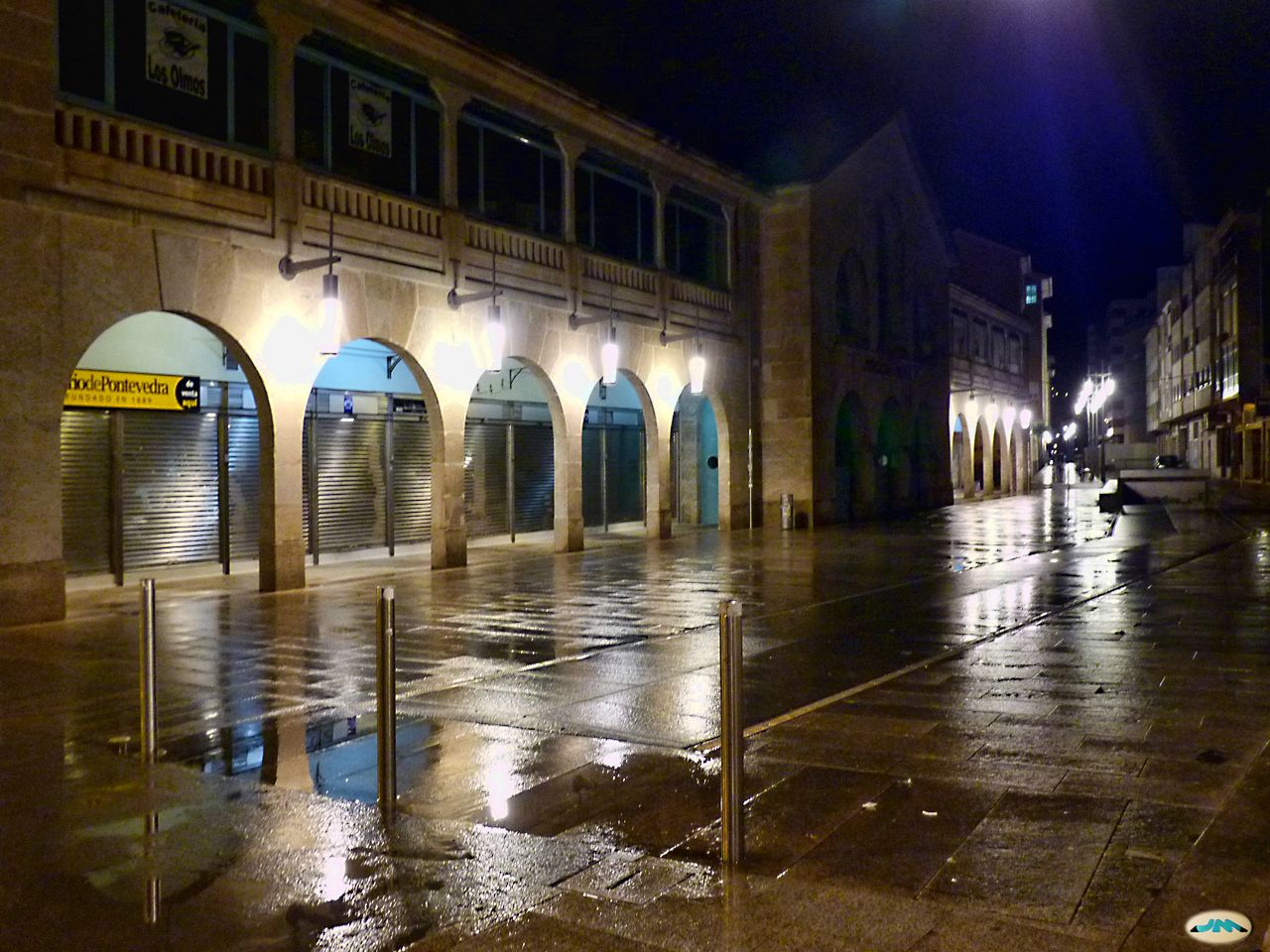
Arcades of the market's main façade at night.

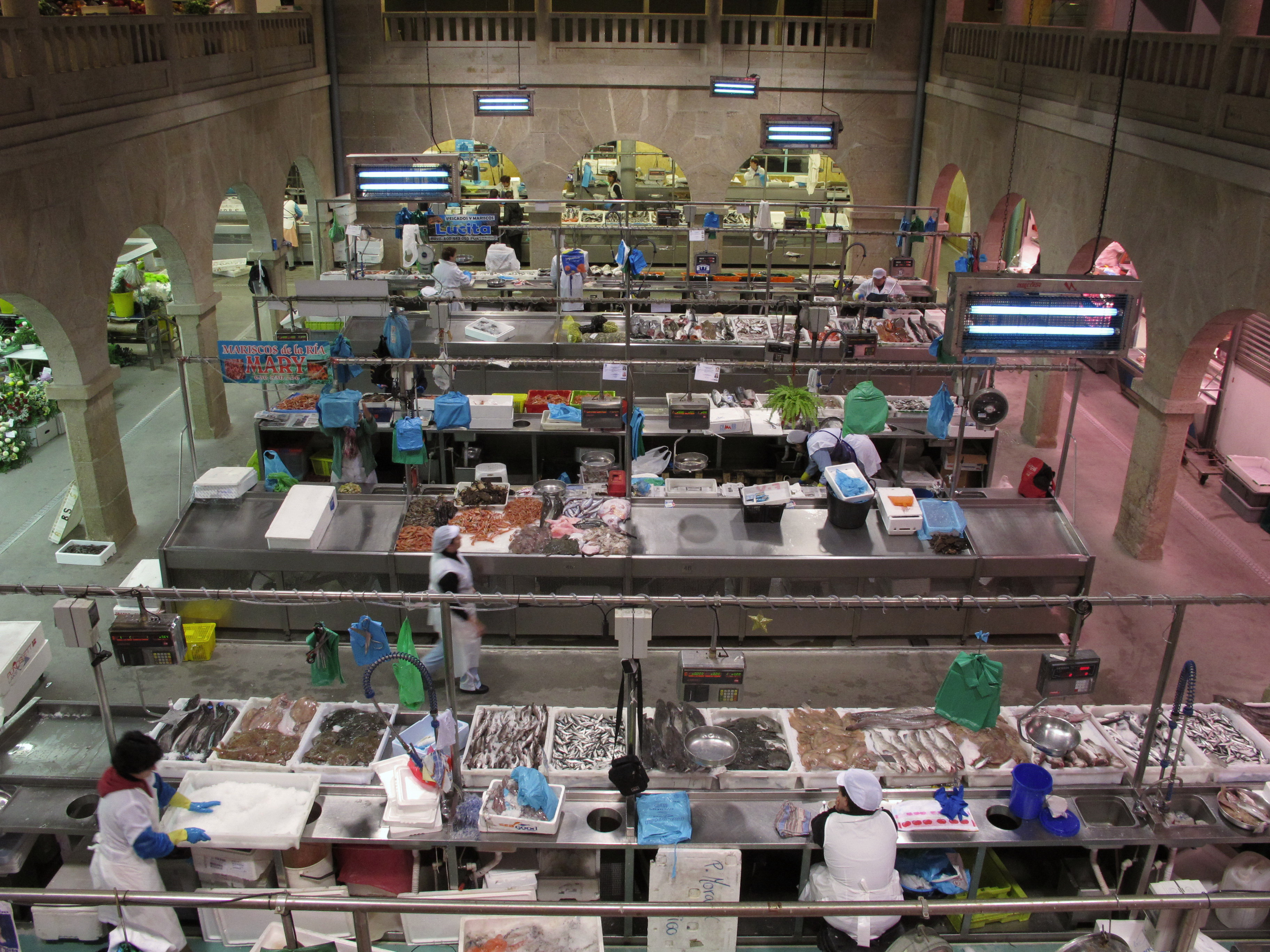
Inner courtyard and stalls.

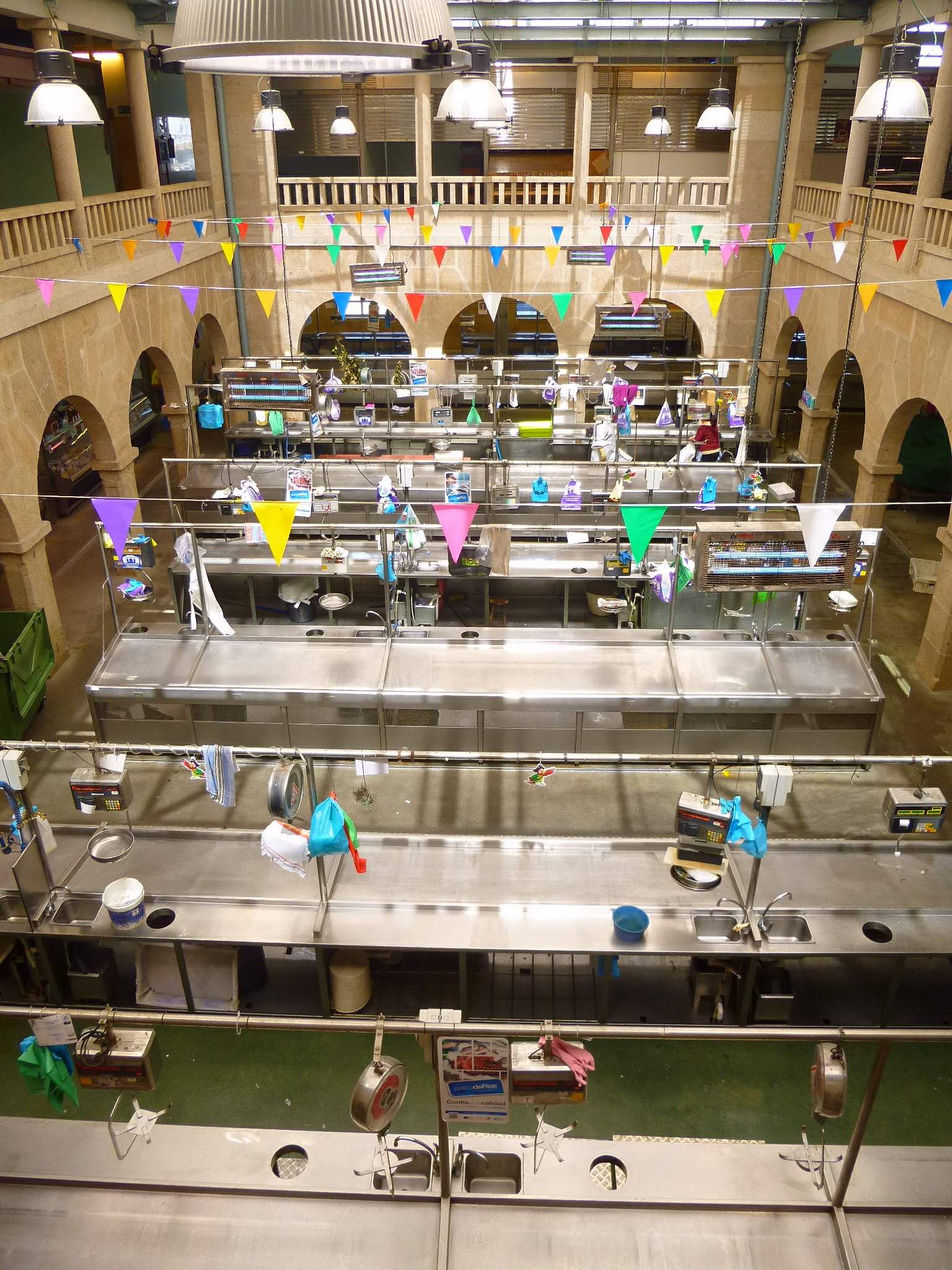
Empty stalls.

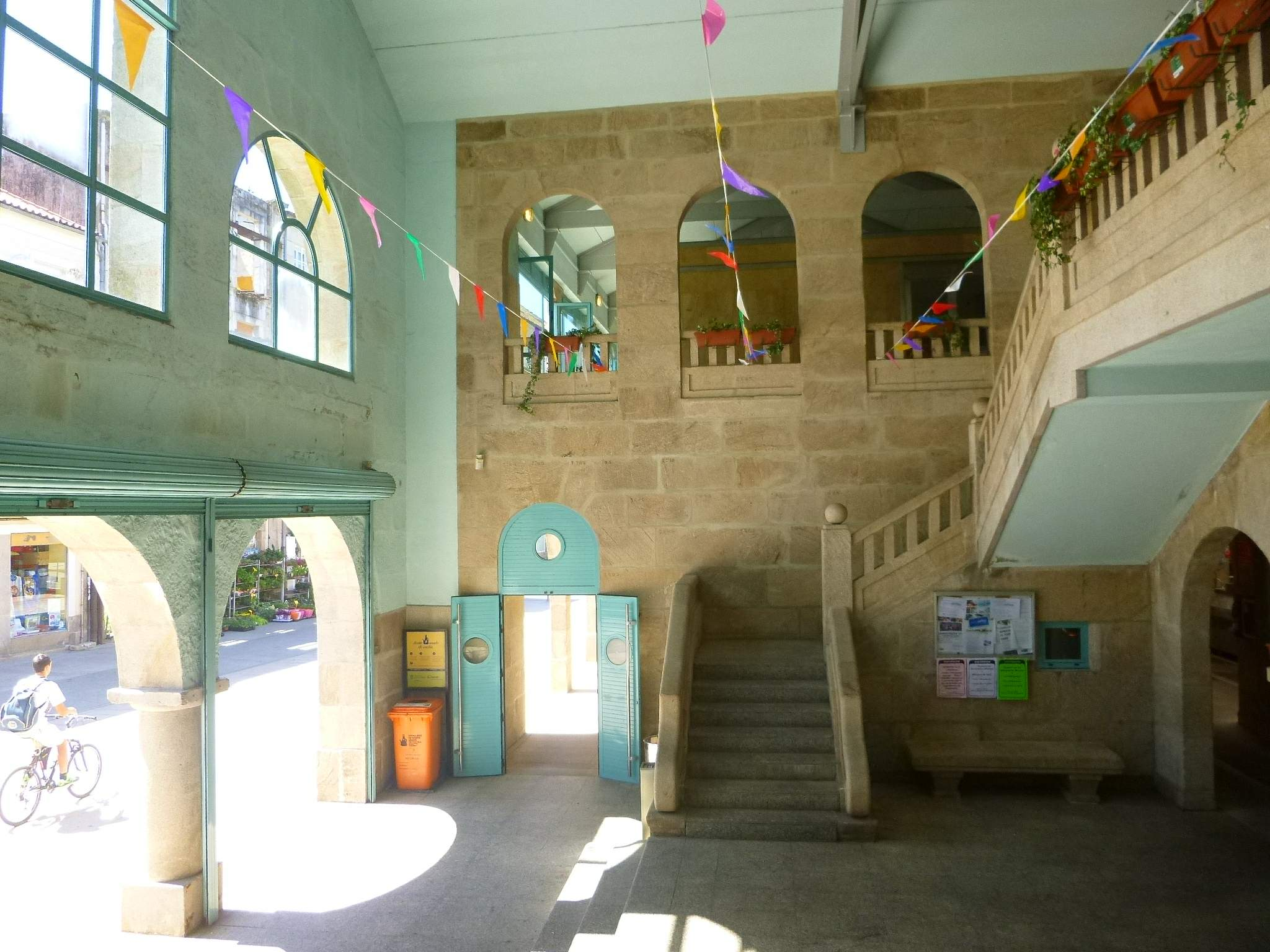
Entrance and central interior staircase.

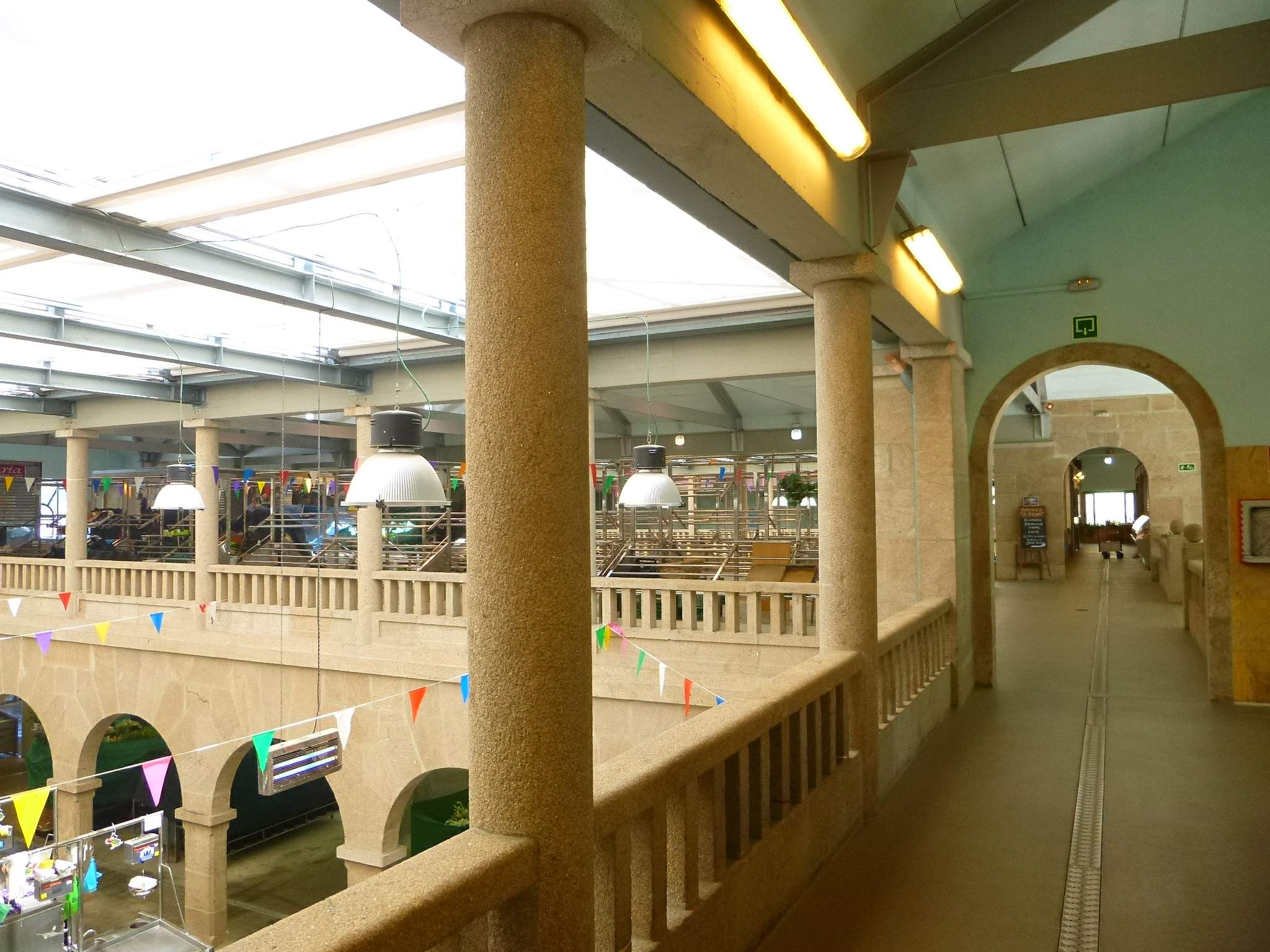
Balcony opening onto one of the inner courtyards.

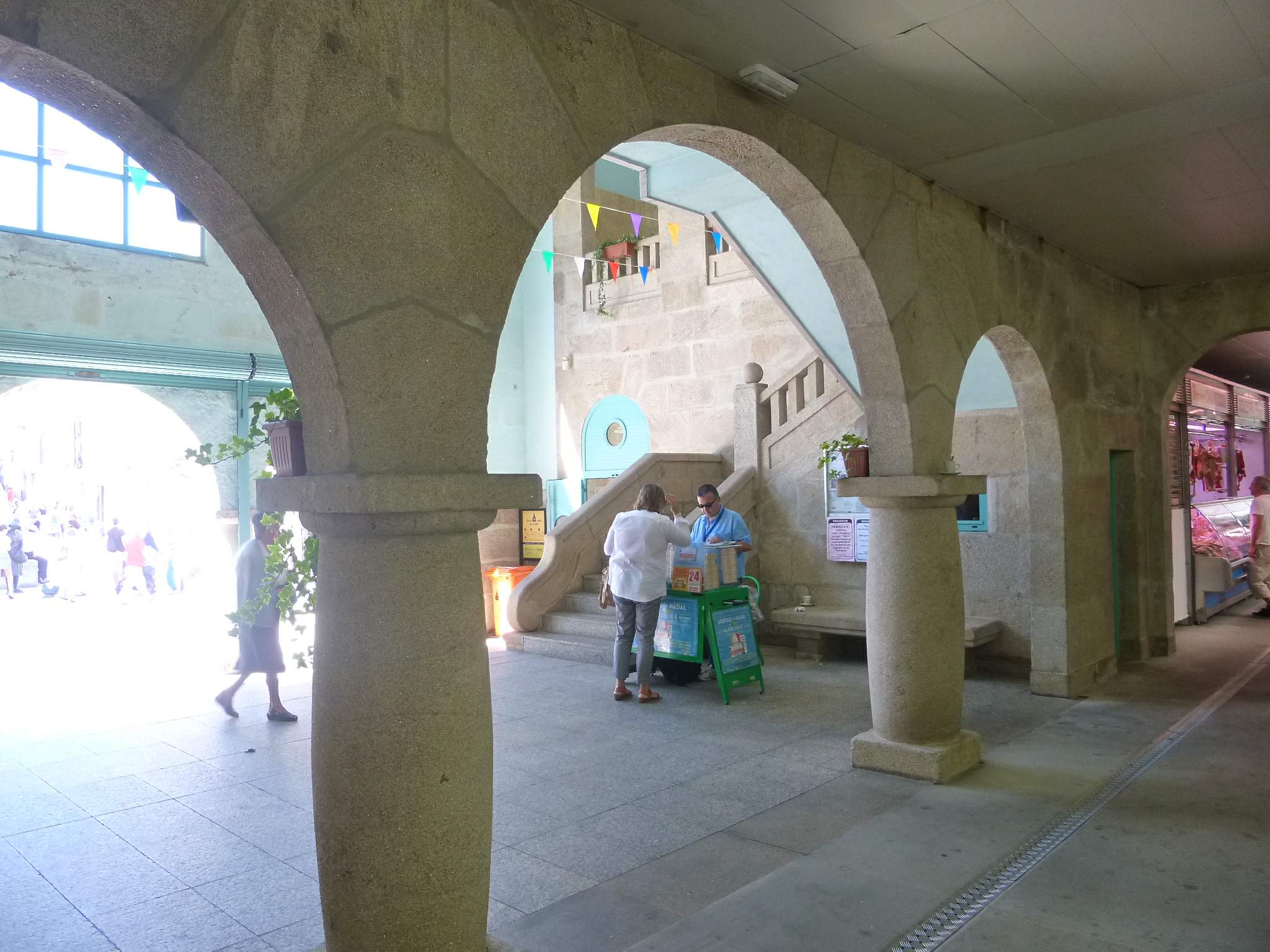
Interior arcades.

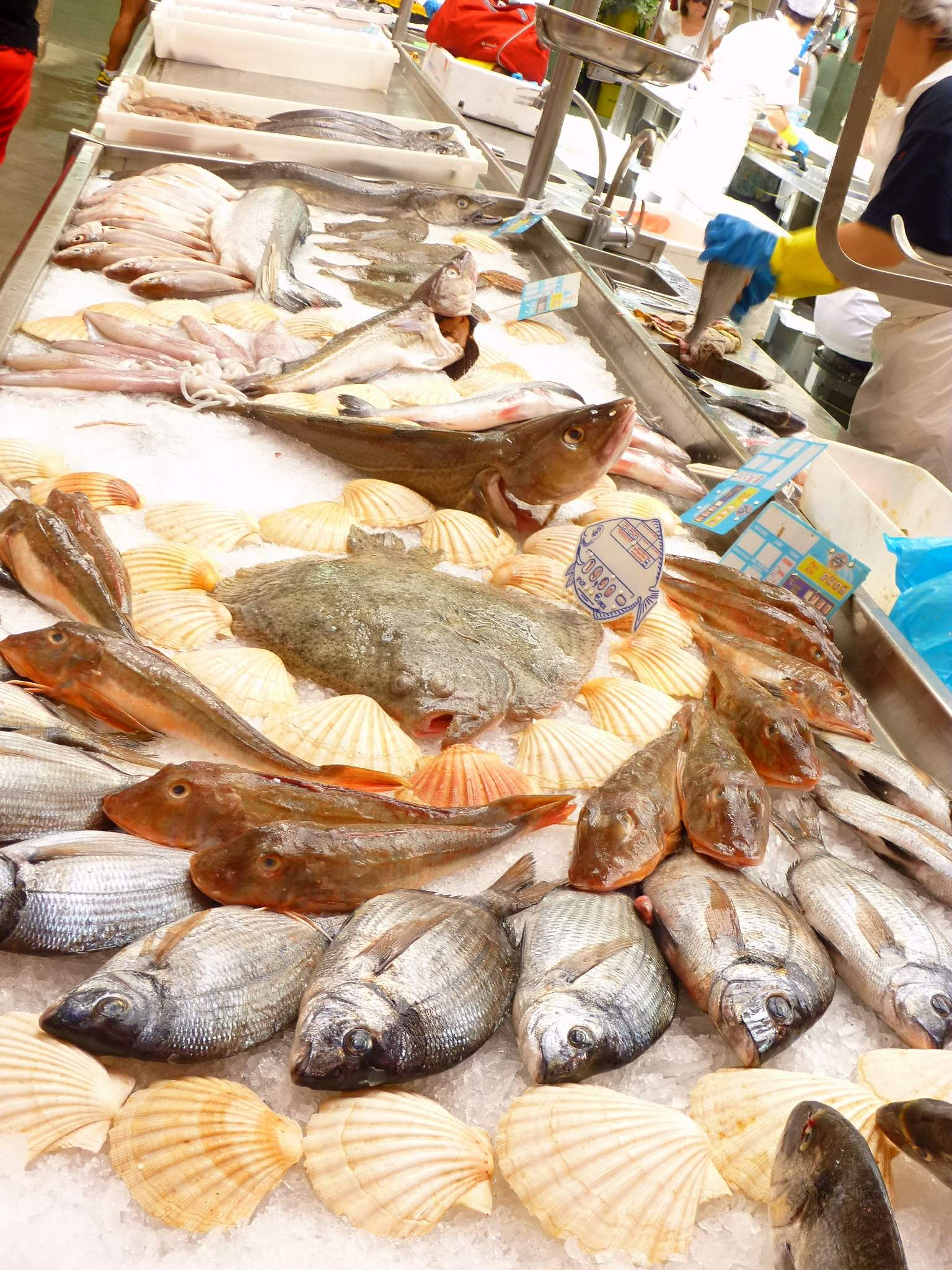
Fish.

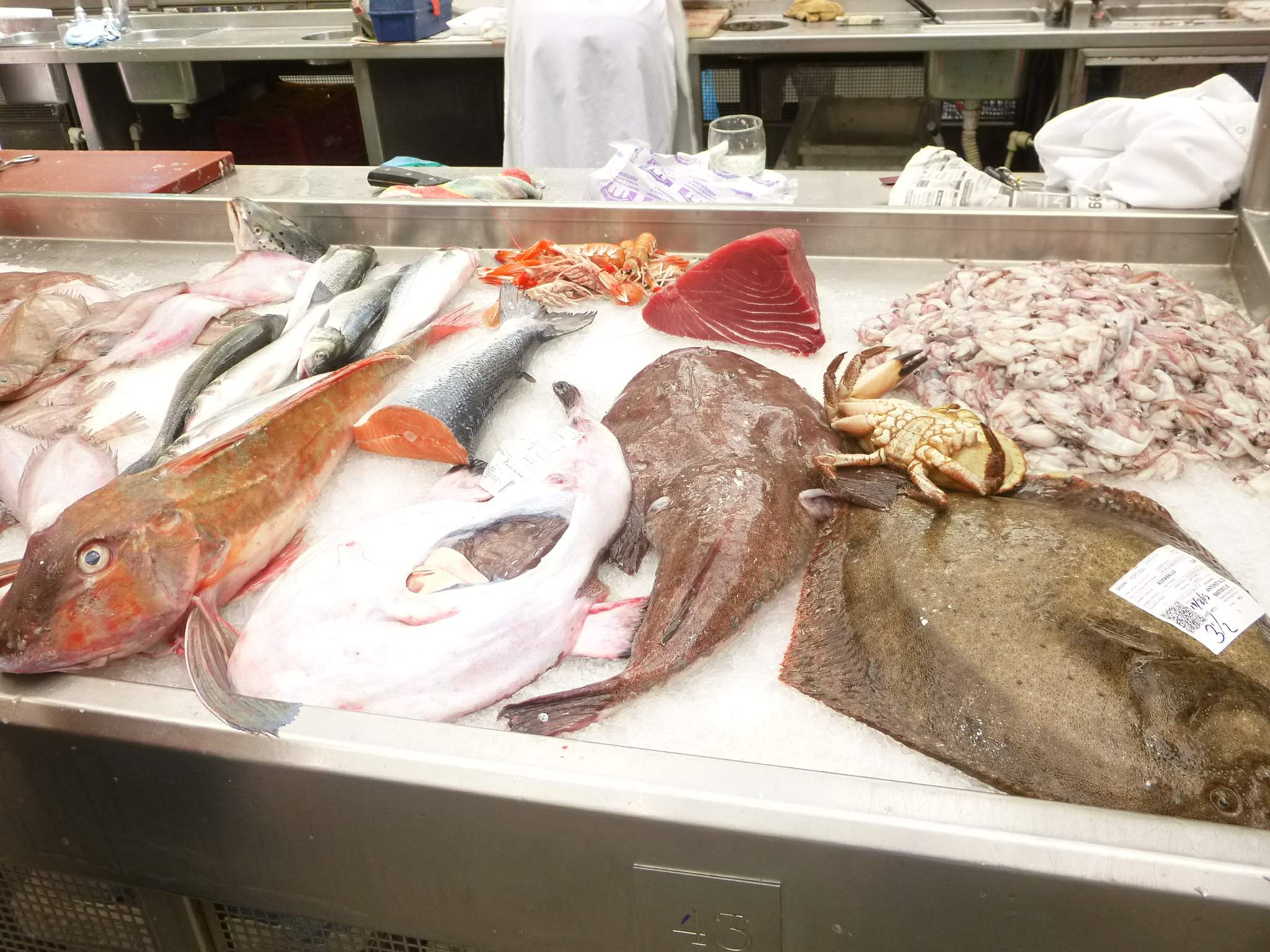
Fish.

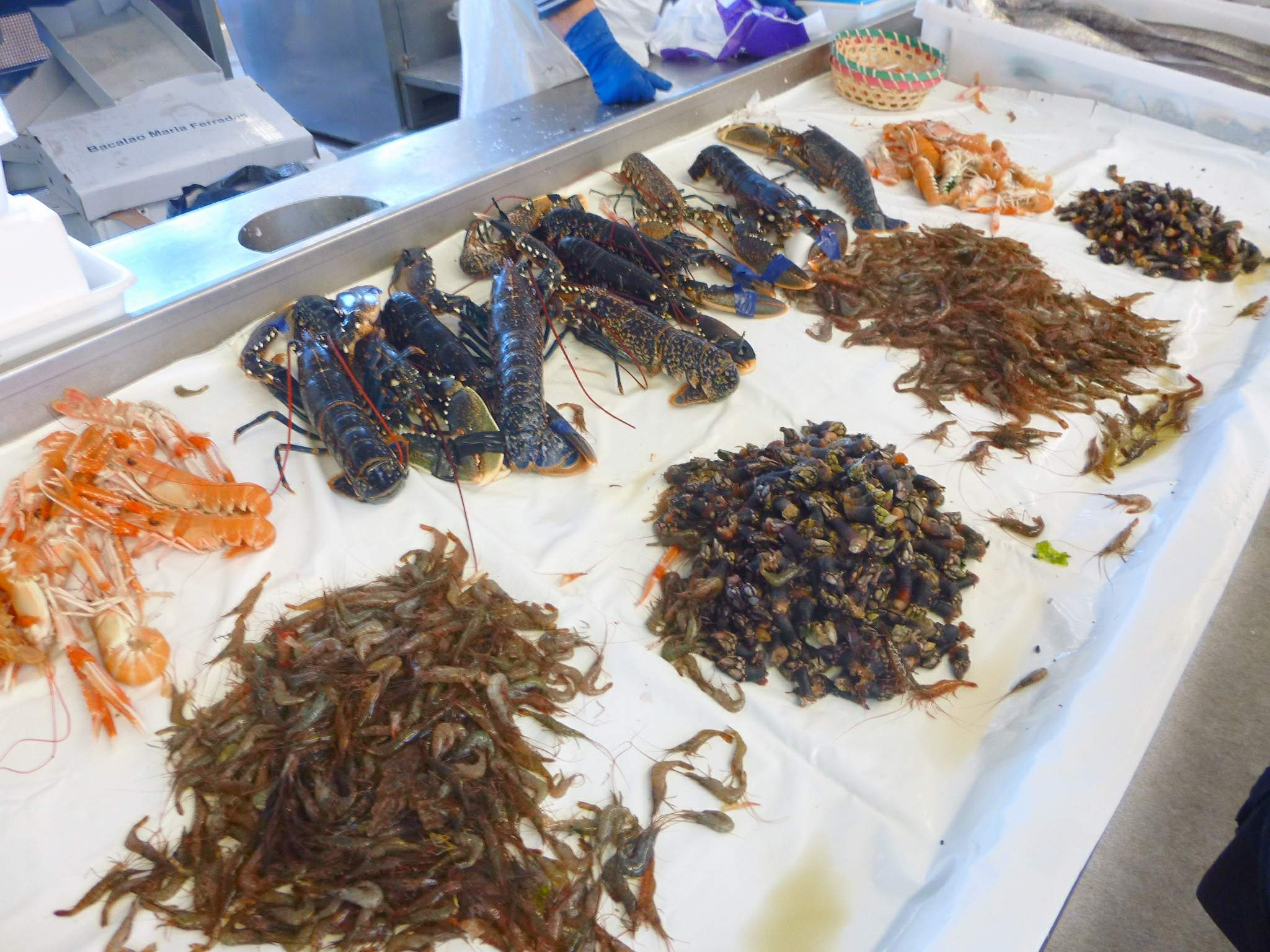
Seafood.

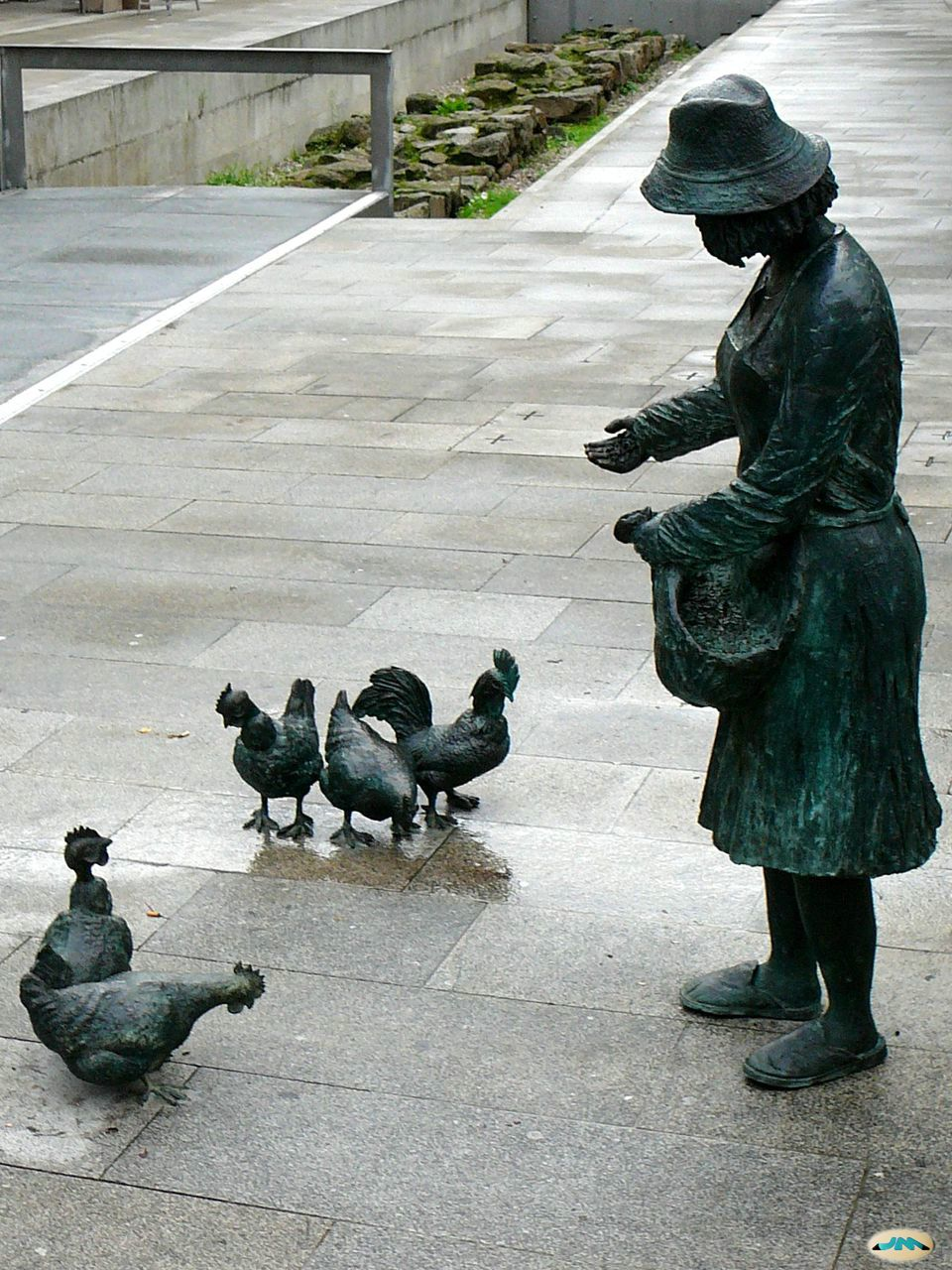
Woman with chickens and remains of the ramparts.

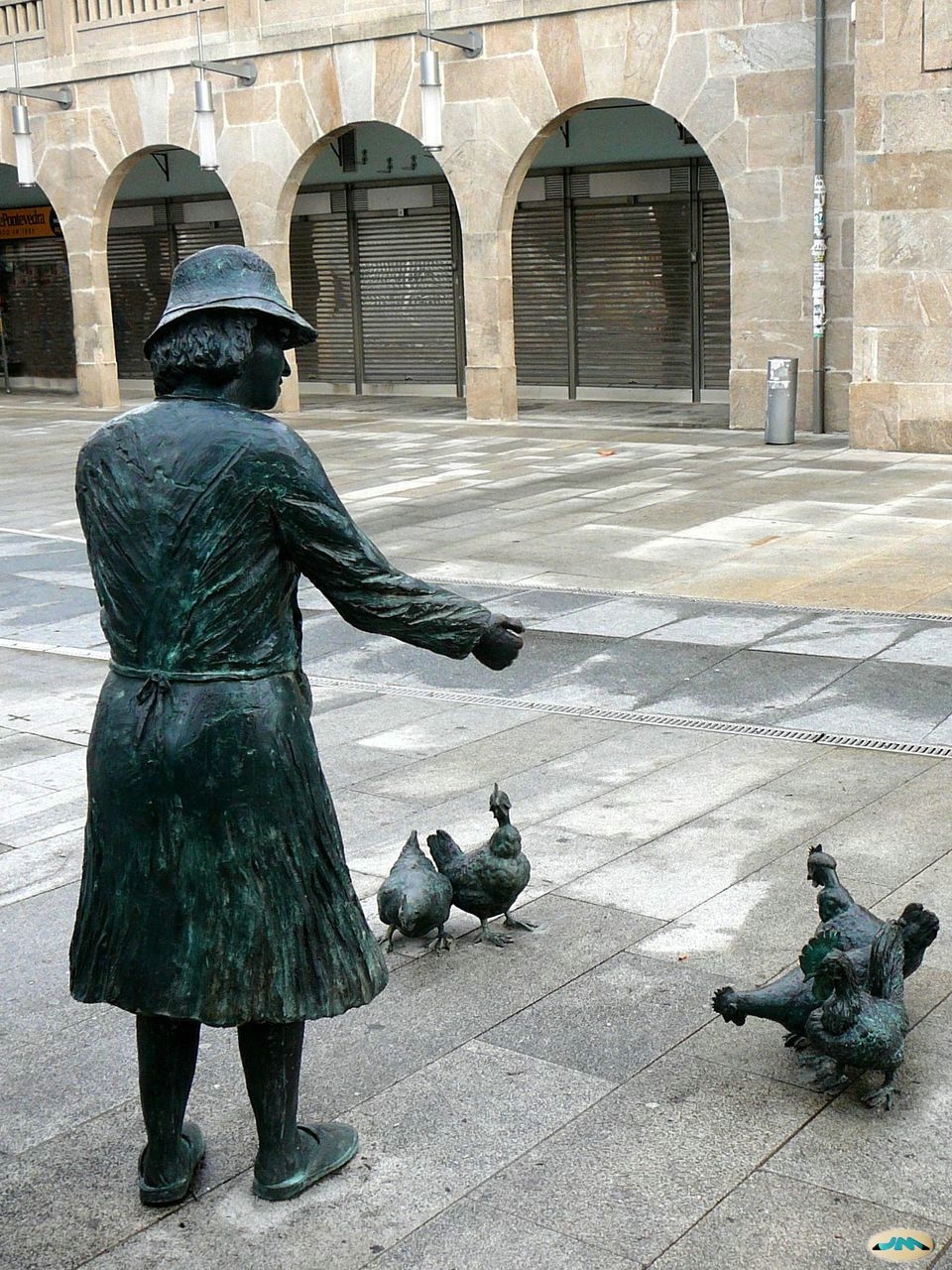
A moza das galiñas in front of the market arcades.

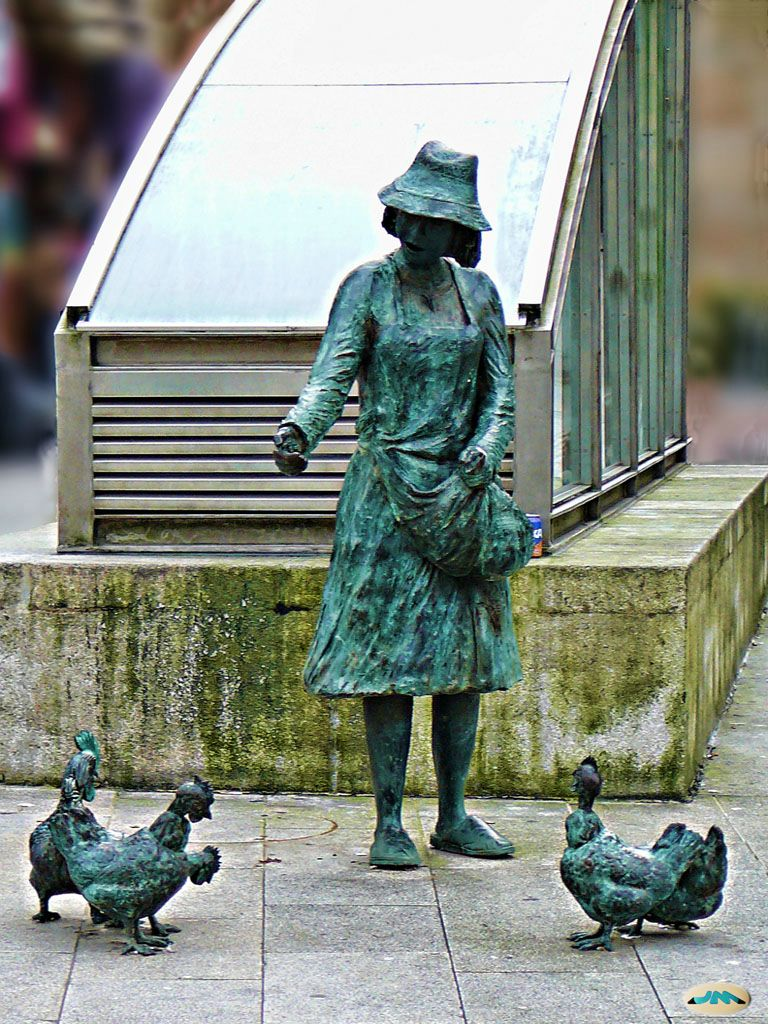
Sculptural group in front of one of the entrances to the underground market car park.

== Annexes ==
=== Bibliography ===
- Abelleira Doldán, Miguel (2016). La arquitectura en Galicia durante la autarquía: 1939–1953 (in Spanish). La Coruña: Universidade da Coruña.
- Aganzo, Carlos (2010). Pontevedra. Ciudades con encanto (in Spanish). Madrid: El País-Aguilar. p. 83. ISBN 978-8403509344.
- Fontoira Surís, Rafael (2009). Pontevedra monumental (in Galician). Pontevedra: Diputación de Pontevedra. p. 529. ISBN 9788484573272.
- Riveiro Tobío, Elvira (2008). Descubrir Pontevedra (in Spanish). Pontevedra: Edicións do Cumio. p. 24. ISBN 9788482890852.

=== Related articles ===
- Caixa de Pontevedra
- Burgo Bridge

=== External links ===
- (es) Official site
- (es) Mercado de Abastos Guía Repsol
- (es) Mercado de Abastos de Pontevedra
- (es) on the website Visit-Pontevedra
- (es) Mercado de Pontevedra
