= Caixa de Pontevedra =

Former savings bank in Pontevedra, Spain

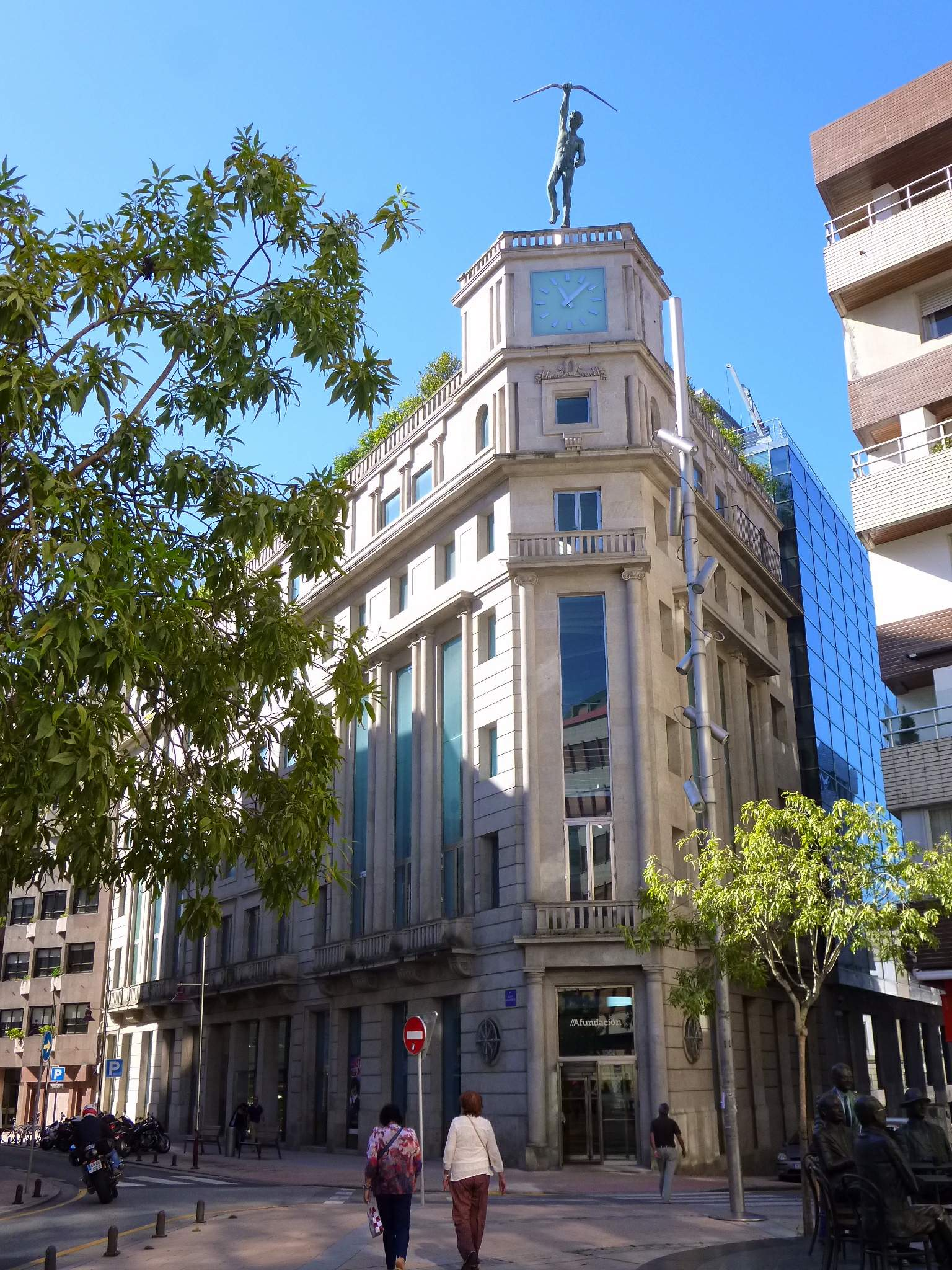
- Type: 1930–2000: Savings bank
- Industry: Financial services and Social work
- Founded: 1930
- Defunct: 2000
- Successor: Abanca
- Headquarters: Augusto González Besada Street, 2, 36001 Pontevedra, Spain
- Key people: Daniel de la Sota (Chairman),
- Website: www.caixapontevedra.es

The Provincial Savings Bank of Pontevedra (Caixa de Aforros Provincial de Pontevedra or Caixa de Pontevedra) was a Spanish financial institution based in the city of Pontevedra (Spain) dependent on the Provincial Council of Pontevedra (provincial deputation), existing between 1930 and 2000.

== History ==
It was founded in Pontevedra on 12 January 1930 and started its activity on 20 January 1930. Its first president was Daniel de la Sota and its first director Alexandre Bóveda. After Daniel de la Sota's dismissal as president of the provincial deputation, the military man Manuel Casas Medrano took over and Alexandre Bóveda resigned. In the years of the Second Spanish Republic, the company began to expand in the north of the province of Pontevedra, with branches in various towns. At the beginning of 1938, a purge of personnel was carried out, in accordance with the provisions of the National Defence Council.

Between 1940 and 1960, the savings banks underwent a period of expansion throughout Spain, under the auspices of legislative reforms. At this time, the first branches were opened in Ponte Caldelas, Tomiño and Caldas de Reis. At this stage there were clashes with the Municipal Savings Bank of Vigo over the occupation of different spaces, a situation in which the Ministry of Labour intervened.

In 1944, the entity acquired a building under construction in Campolongo where it set up its headquarters, designed by the architect Emilio Quiroga Losada. The building was inaugurated in 1949 and was enlarged in the 1950s, designed by Robustiano Fernández Cochón. The building was expanded again between 1971 and 1973, with the construction of an auditorium and various offices, which for a time housed the classrooms of the National University of Distance Education.

The Savings bank has participated in the financing of public works in the city of Pontevedra, such as the Youth Stadium or Estadio de la Juventud (now the Galician Sports Technification Centre) or the Pasarón Stadium, as well as the construction of various social housing units. In 1965, it built the Virgin Pilgrim Student Residence, originally intended for a Menor College, for students of the Bachillerato, Education and Industrial Masters (Escuela de Maestría). In the field of social work, the entity has sponsored sports teams such as Pontevedra CF or SD Teucro.

In 1980, it created the Julio Camba prize for journalism. In 1977, several conversations began to create a large Galician savings bank. Negotiations were held with Caixa Galicia, following the merger of the savings banks of A Coruña, Lugo, Santiago de Compostela and Ferrol but the refusal of the savings bank of Vigo pushed back the joint project. In the face of this diatribe, in the 1980s it carried out a phase of expansion with the opening of branches in different Galician cities and even in Madrid.

In 1990, various collaborations began with the savings bank of Ourense and Vigo, culminating in the year 2000 with the merger and creation of the private entity Caixanova. The percentage of shares that corresponded to it in the new savings bank was 24%. In turn, Caixanova merged in 2010 with Gaixa Galicia, and the process resulted in the entity Abanca.

The new Social and Cultural Centre of the Savings Bank was inaugurated in 2006, with a wide-ranging cultural programme including poetry, literature and art workshops, exhibitions by national and international museums, plays, concerts and conferences in its auditorium. In 2010 it was renamed Centro Social y Cultural Afundación.

== The building ==
After the demolition of the San José chapel, the building of the Caja de Ahorros Provincial de Pontevedra was built in St. Joseph's Square. This headquarters was built in three stages: the original building was begun in 1944 and became the headquarters of the Pontevedra Savings Bank in 1948. The building occupied a plot of 200 square metres in the Plaza de San José and was a stone building of noble appearance, with a ground floor and four floors, according to the project of Emilio Quiroga Losada, the municipal architect.

The second section was designed as an extension along González Besada Street in 1956. This extension was designed and built by the architects Robustiano Fernández Cochón and Laureano Barreiro. The last part consisted of the execution of an annex of modern architecture with a façade on San José and Augusto García Sánchez streets, built between 1970 and 1974 by the architect Joaquín Basilio Bas. Since the renovation, the building has a large auditorium with over 800 seats.

The building was completely renovated by the architect César Portela in 2004 and inaugurated on 15 July 2006. It has a surface area of 12,000 square metres of construction and retains two stone facades, combined with an enormous glass cube on the rear facade which opens onto Avenida Augusto García Sánchez and gives it a striking modern and avant-garde appearance. The building is crowned on the façade of its main entrance by a 6-metre high bronze sculpture by the sculptor Cándido Pazos, created in 2006, representing the Greek archer Teucer, the mythical founder of the city of Pontevedra. On the south façade, the bas-reliefs by Xoan Piñeiro The Sea and The Countryside have been restored.

Inside the building there is a large hall that is accessed from the main entrance on Augusto González Besada Street and connects the different rooms. Five large sculptures by the sculptor Sergio Portela are strategically placed in this hall to meet their eyes. A camellia garden has been installed on the terrace and in the two interior patios there is an 11-metre waterfall and 15-metre high hanging gardens. In addition to an auditorium with over 800 seats, the building has a conference room and three large exhibition halls.

== Gallery ==
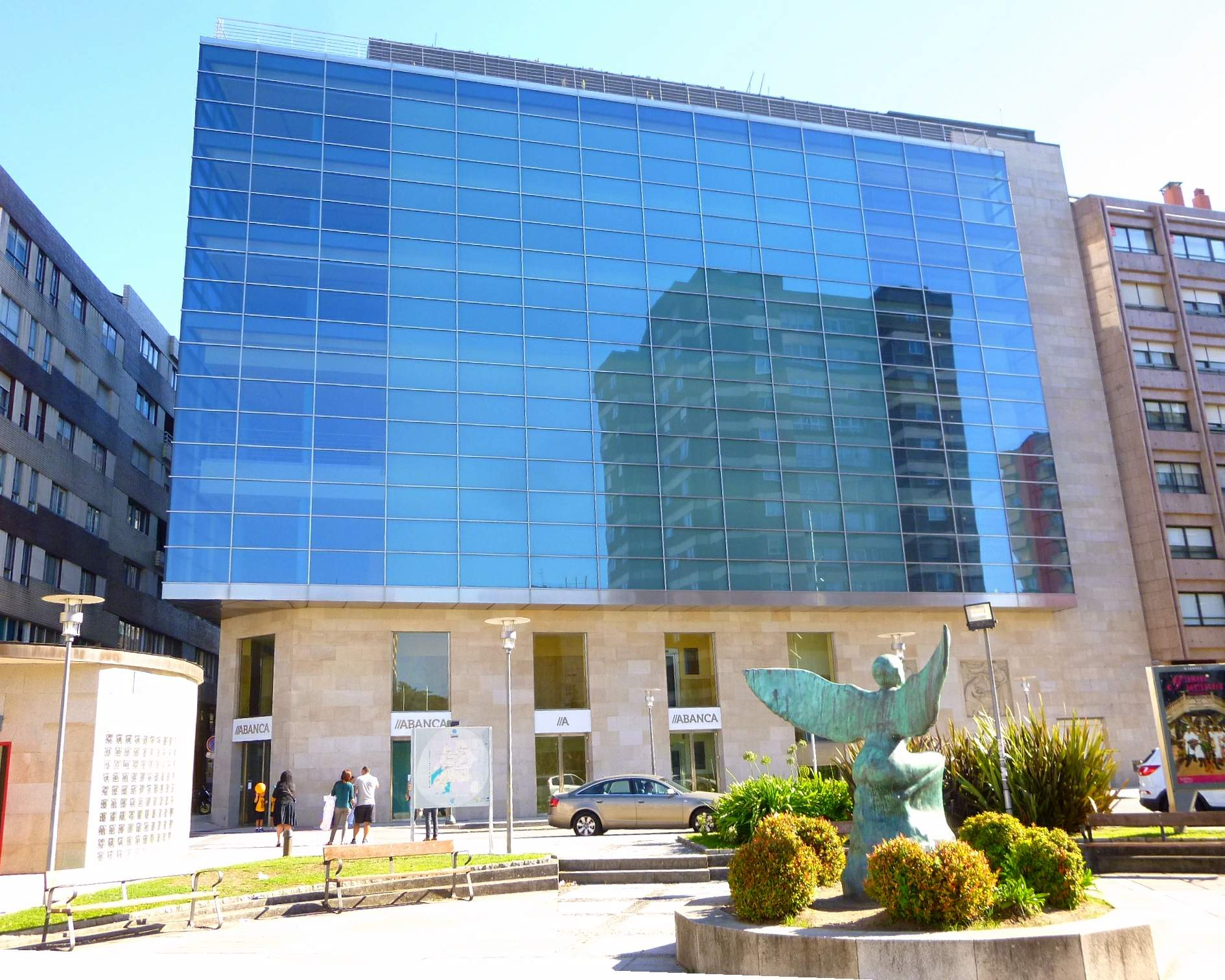
Glass facade on Augusto García Sánchez Avenue

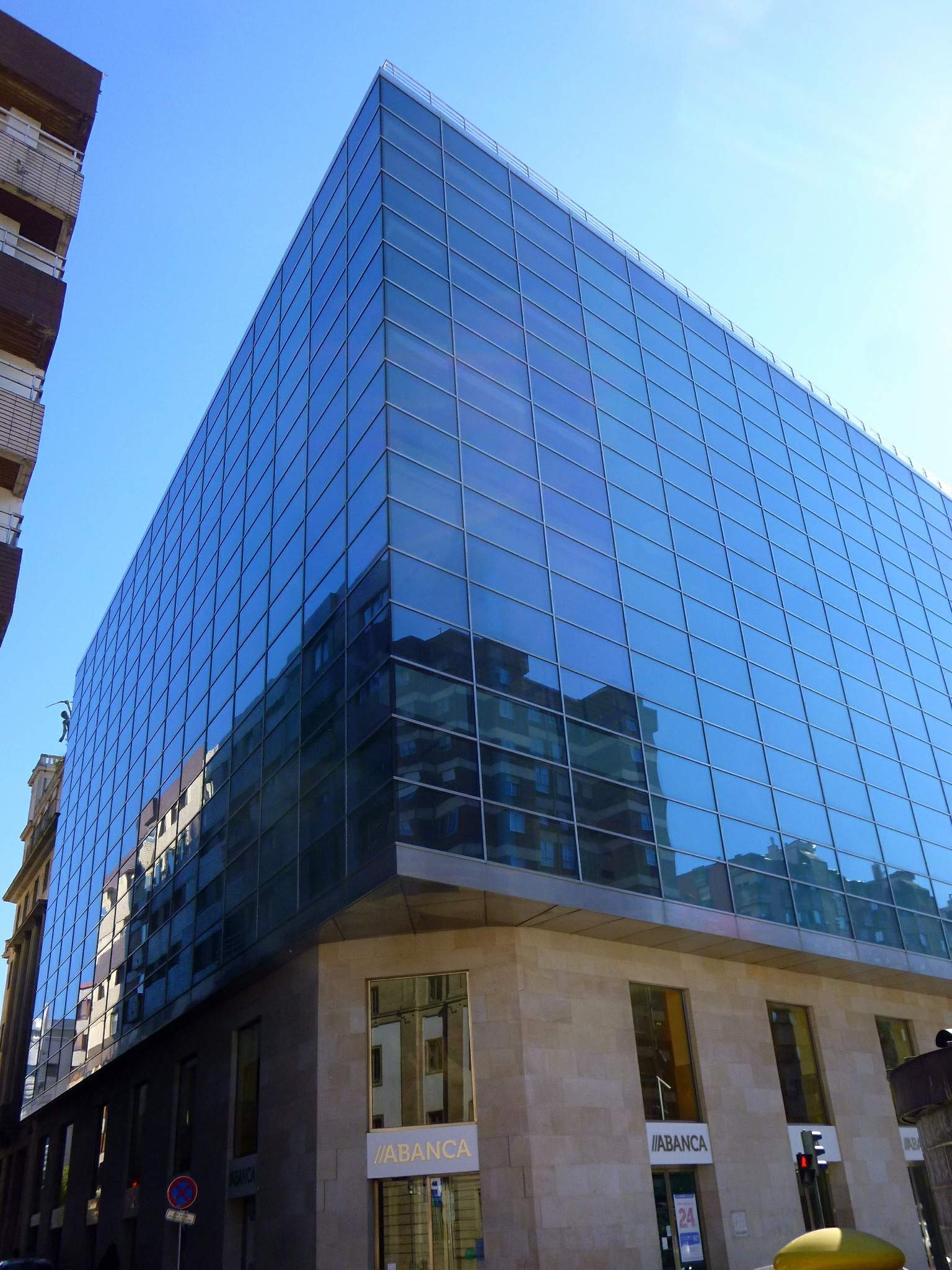
Glass facades in Saint Joseph Street and Augusto García Sánchez Avenue

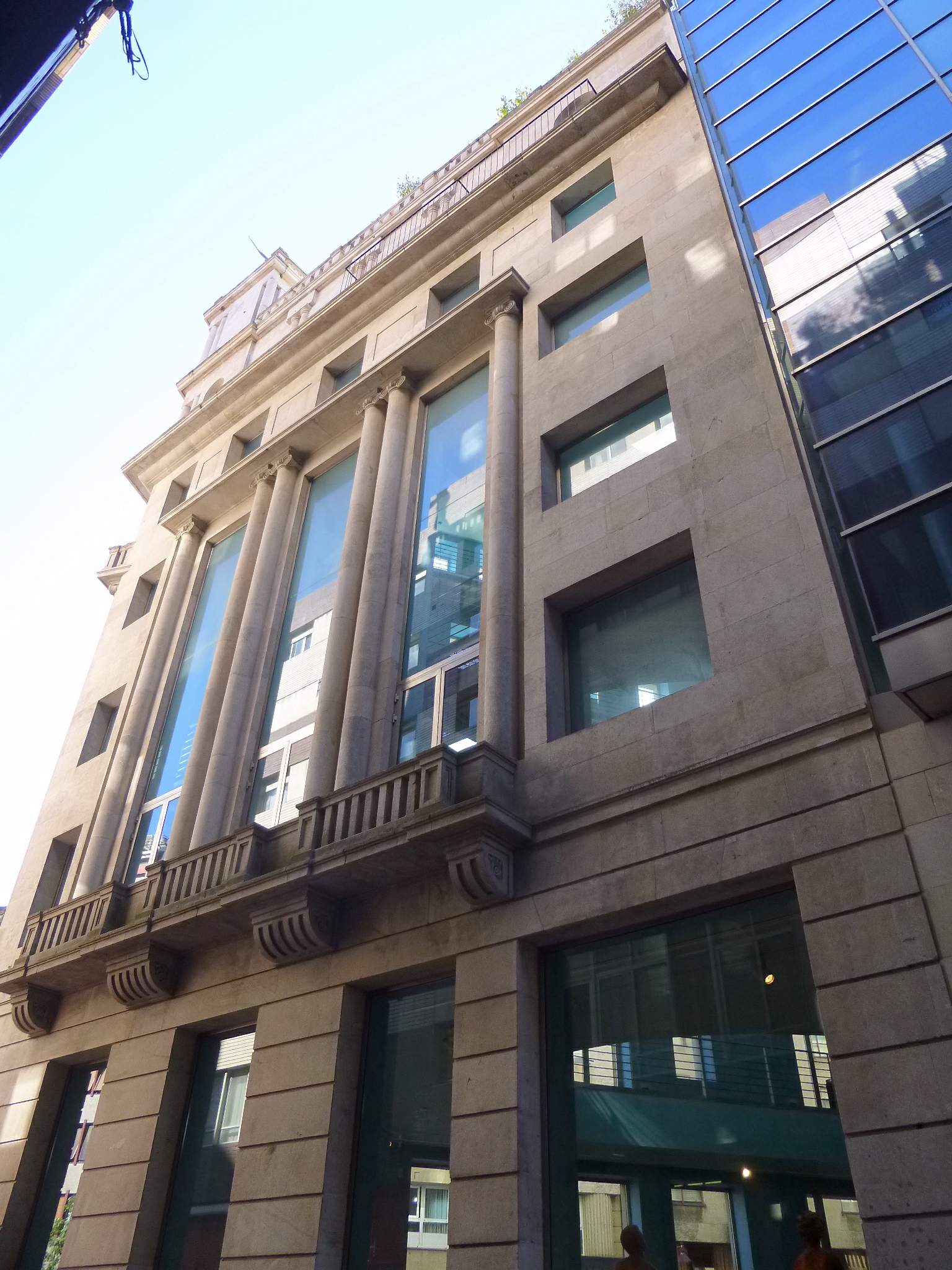
San Jose street façade

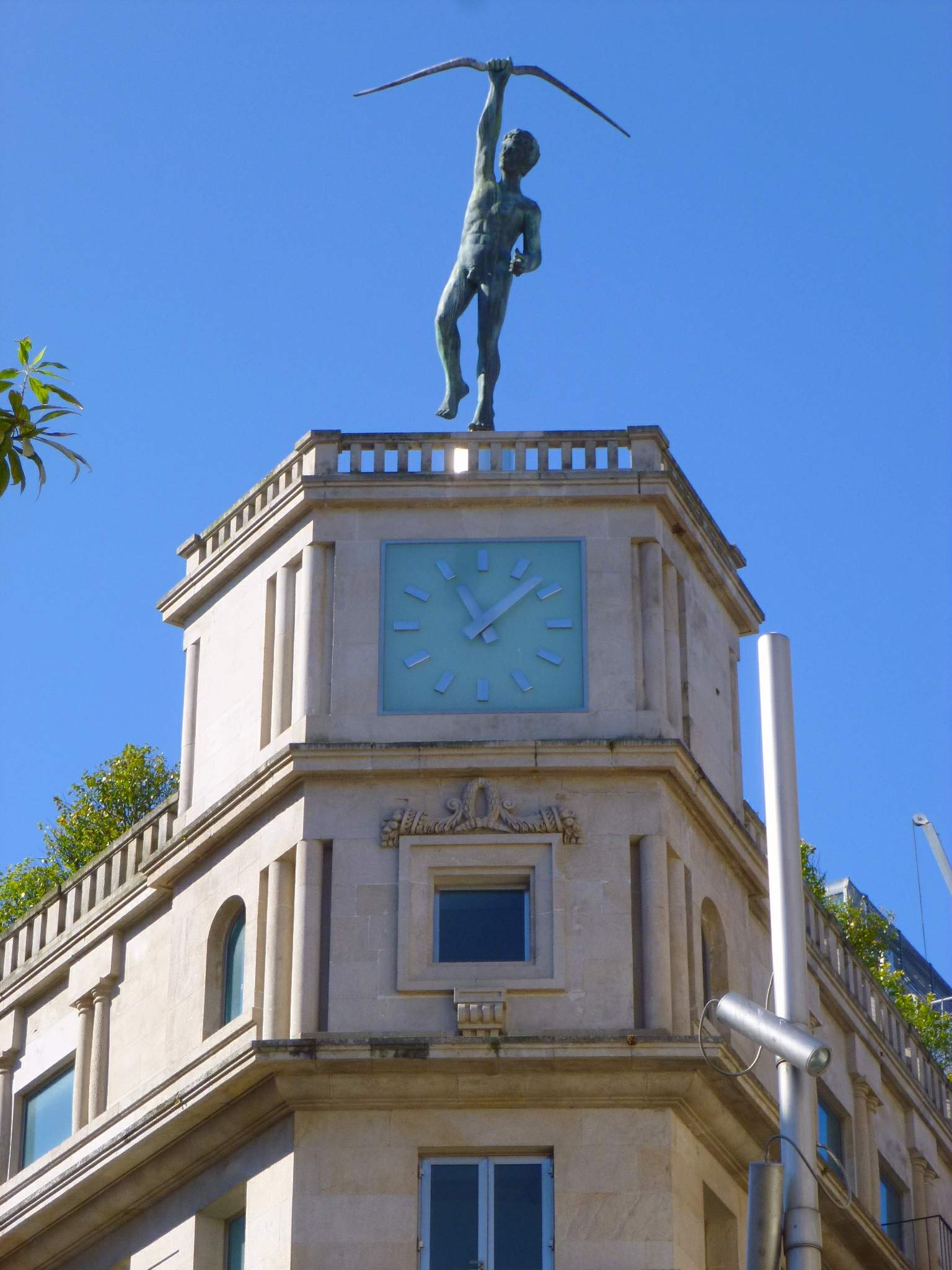
The Greek archer Teucer crowning the building

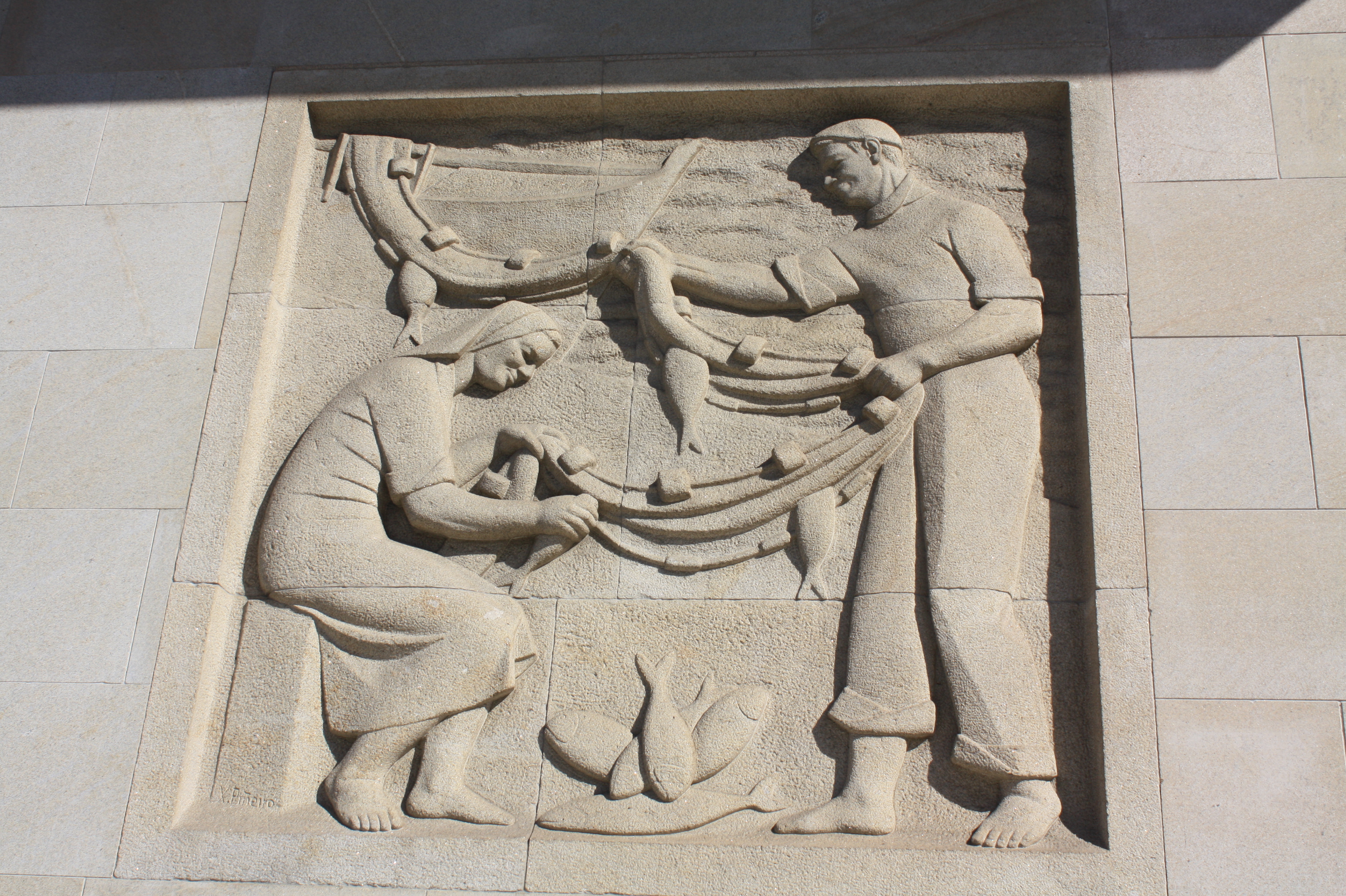
Bas relief The Sea

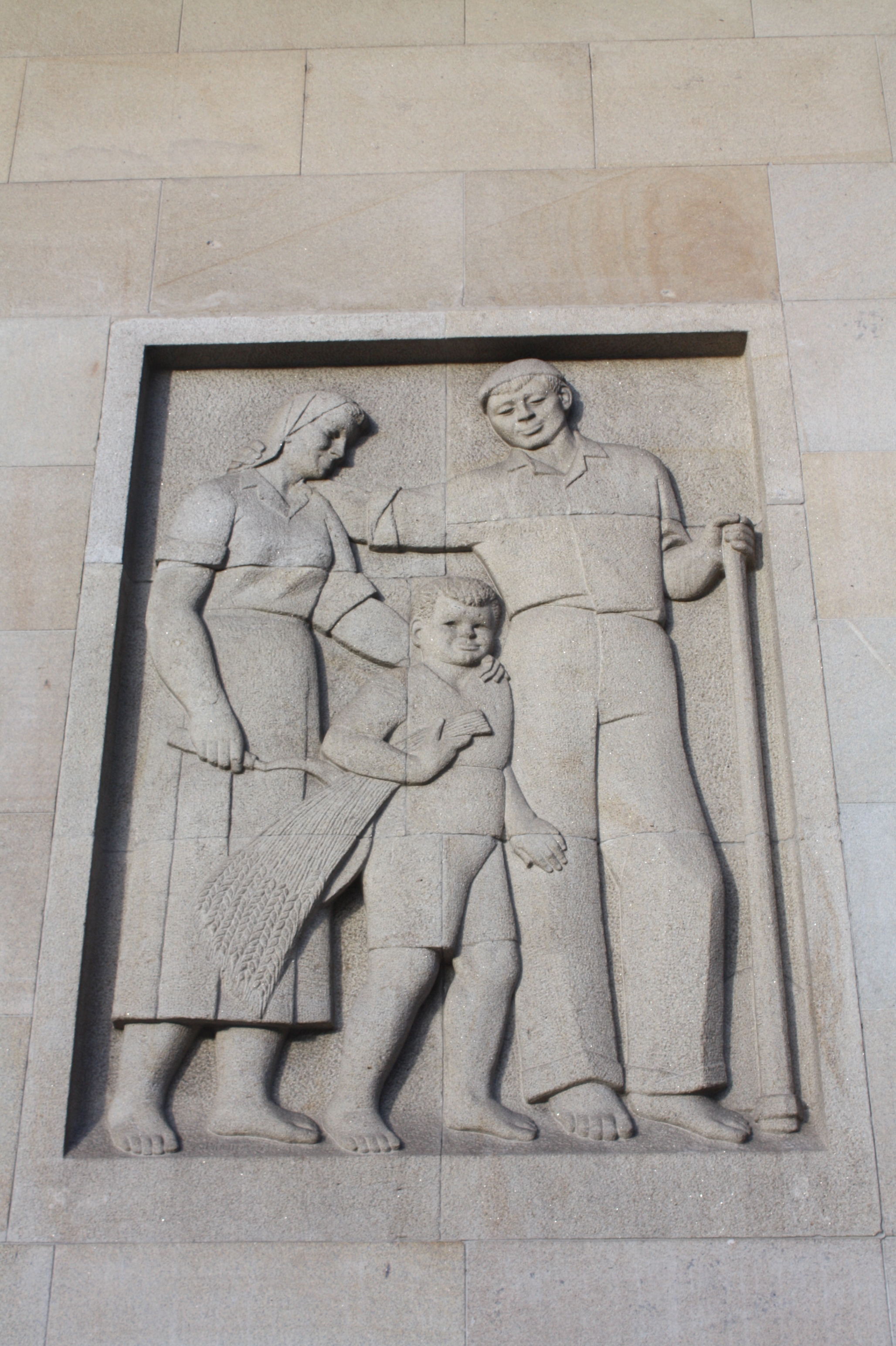
Bas relief The Countryside

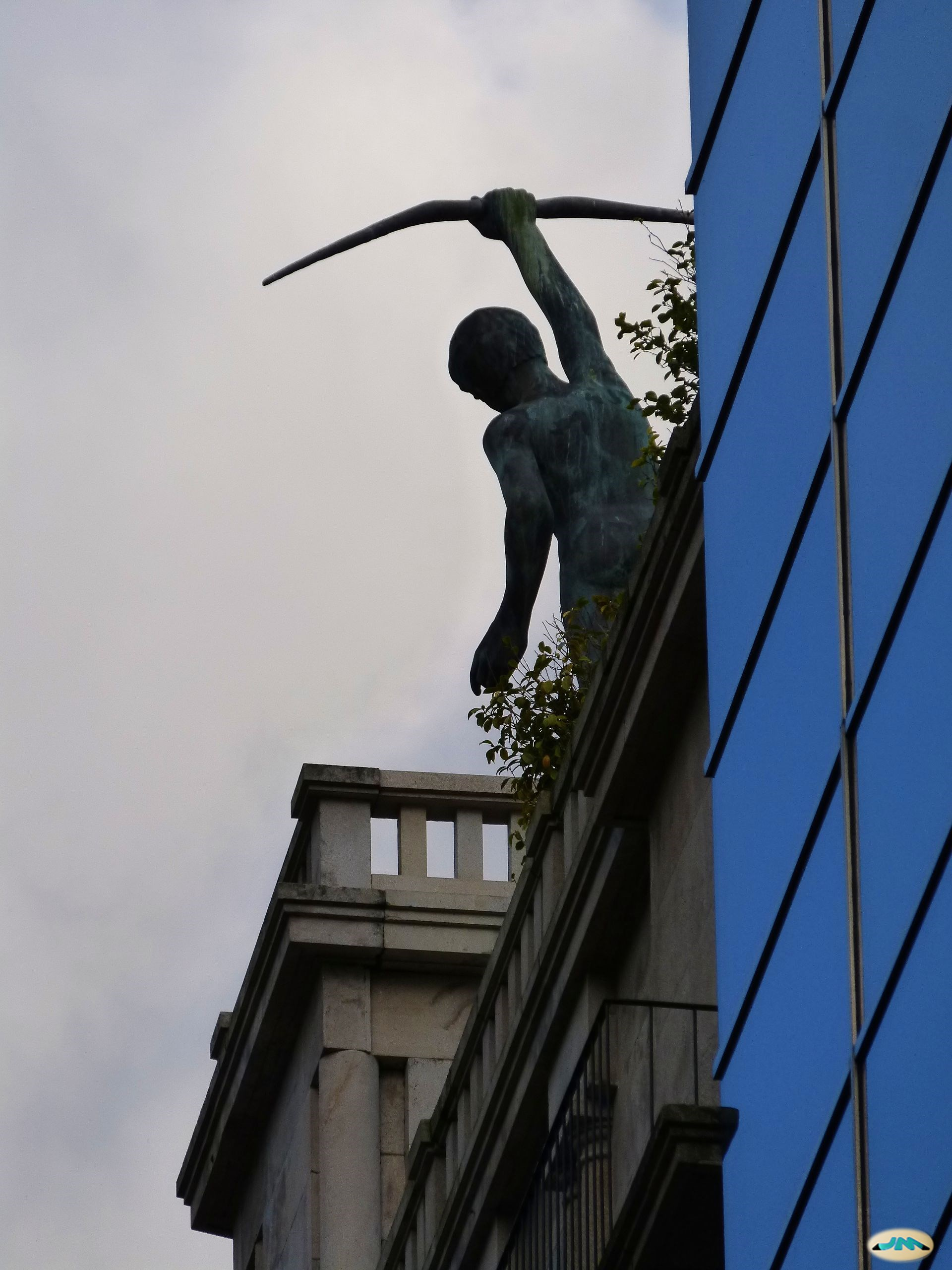
Greek Archer Teucer

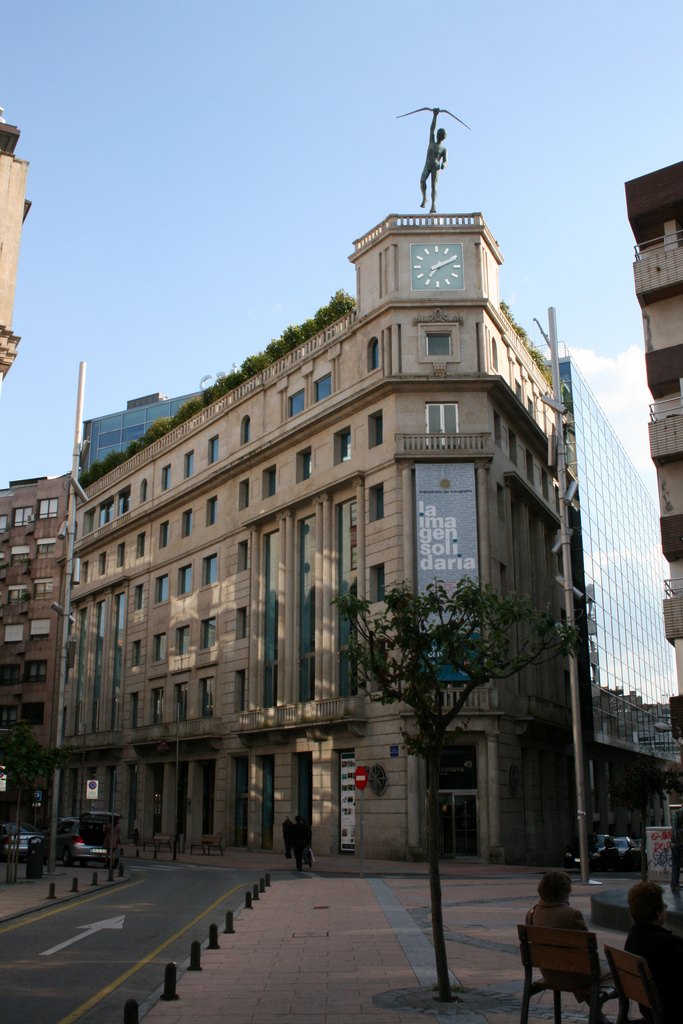
Façade of St. Joseph's Square

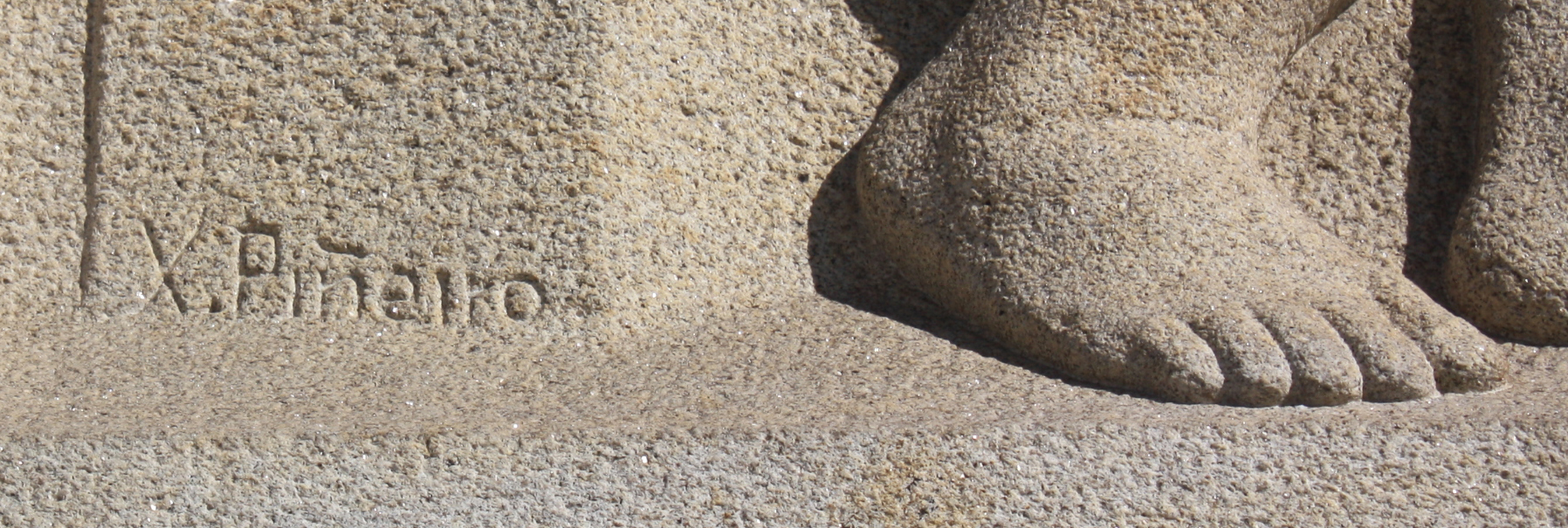
Detail of one of Xoan Piñeiro's bas-reliefs and signature

== See also ==
- Plaza de San José
- Palace of the Deputation of Pontevedra
- List of banks in Spain

== Bibliography ==
- Aganzo, Carlos (2010). Ciudades con encanto: Pontevedra. El País-Aguilar. pp. 100–101.
- López Torre, Rafael (2000). La Caja de Pontevedra. 1930/2000. Caja de Pontevedra.
