= Main Bazaar =

Shopping locality in Ooty, Tamil Nadu

Main Bazaar is an important shopping locality in Ooty, Tamil Nadu, India. It forms part of Ward number 30 of the Ooty constituency. The bazaar features both government-run shops and privately owned shopping outlets. All the produce from in and around Ooty are sold in this bazaar. The different produce sold are different varieties of Tea, groceries and cutlery items. The other items sold in the place include paintings by local painters and clothing reflecting the local culture.

== See also ==
- Ooty Market
- Ooty bus stand
- St. Joseph's Higher Secondary School, Ooty
