= Sadar, Iran =

Sadar صادر
- Village
- Location within Iran
- Coordinates: 26°56′52″N 57°28′09″E
- Country: Iran
- Province: Hormozgan
- County: Minab
- Bakhsh: Senderk
- Rural District: Bondar

Population (2006)
  - Total: 163
- Time zone: UTC+3:30 (IRST)
  - Summer (DST): UTC+4:30 (IRDT)

Sadar (Persian: صادر, also Romanized as Sādar) is a village in Bondar Rural District, Senderk District, Minab County, Hormozgan Province, Iran. At the 2006 census, its population was 163, in 37 families. Orqqpq
