= Central Market (Tyumen) =

The Central Market
- Центральный рынок
- Address: Herzen Street 95
- Floors: 2
- Parking: on Herzen Street and in the courtyard
- Website: centr-72.ru

The Central Market (Russian: Центральный рынок) is a market in Tyumen (Russia), on the edge of Unity and Concord Square.

== Location ==
The market is situated on the southern side of Unity and Concord Square on Lenin Street. It borders the mentioned square to the north, the shopping center The Central to the west, Herzen Street to the south, and the shopping center TsUM to the east.

== History ==
At the beginning of the 20th century, this area was the city outskirts, located between Moskovskij Trakt (Moscow Highway) and a branch of the Trans-Siberian Railway, which ran along the present Maurice Thorez Street. In the 1920s, Lenin Street was extended to the railway, separating the area from Nemtsov Square. Gradually, wooden houses appeared there. In the early 1960s, these houses were removed to create a new, yet unnamed, square.

The market was designed by Tyumen architect Valery Ginkul, who chose a specific roof shape to resemble Eastern tents. It opened in 1988.

After total privatization in the 1990s, it remained the only municipal market in the city. However, it was actually controlled by a group of Azeri merchants from one village in Azerbaijan. Internal conflicts among the Azeri diaspora led to several confrontations, including the assassination of Galandar Akhmedov, the market's deputy director, in his stairwell on 20. In 1998, city authorities planned to privatize or relocate it to the city outskirts, prompting strong protests from merchants. Similar discussions occurred in 2017 and in 2021.

The market is often criticized for rule violations, including sanitary regulations. In January 2011, Russia's Chief Sanitary Doctor Gennady Onishchenko made an unannounced visit to the market and observed several sanitary issues. Experts also noted that the building itself was in poor condition, potentially hazardous, with its basements unrepaired since its opening in 1981. Local authorities temporarily closed the market and promised to address all issues. It reopened a few days later.

The market operates daily from 8 a.m. to 7 pm.

== Plans ==
In 2015, Tyumen architect Alexei Ivanov prepared a design for the market's reconstruction, but it has yet to be implemented.
