= Sadar (river) =

River in Navarre, Spain

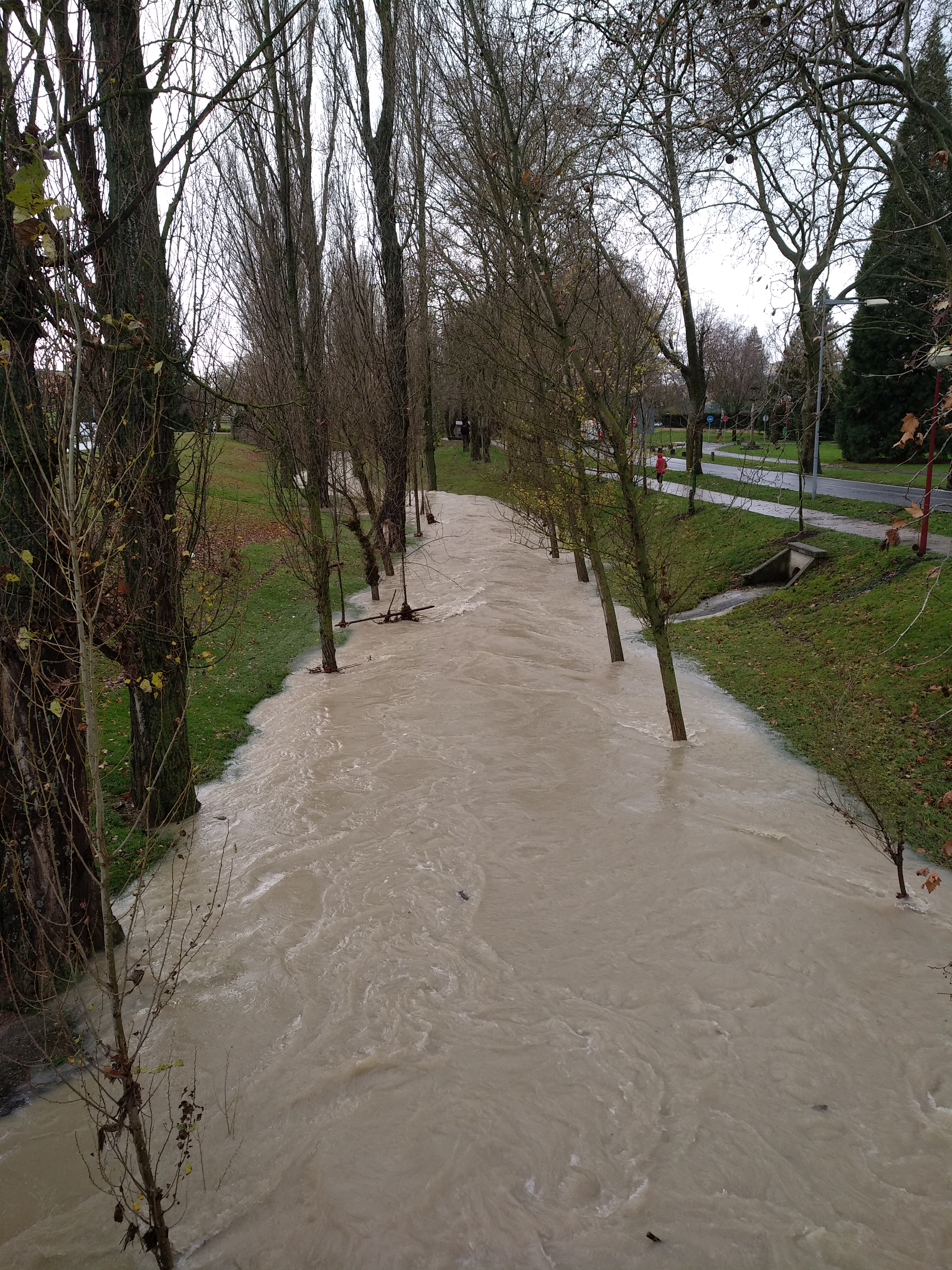
- The Sadar River as it passes through the University of Navarra

Location
- Administrative division: Spain; Navarre

Physical characteristics
- Source: Ebro
  - location: Aranguren
  - coordinates: 42°46′57″N 1°30′41″W
  - elevation: 700 m (2,300 ft)
- Mouth
  - location: Elortz (river)
  - elevation: 410 m (1,350 ft)
- Length: 19 km (12 mi)
- Width
  - average: 70 km^{2} (27 sq mi)

The Sadar River is a tributary of the Elorz River, which rises in the Aranguren and Tajonar mountain ranges, running in a westerly direction, between the Eocene marls of the Cuenca de Pamplona. It is 19 km long and drains a basin of some 70 km^{2}. The average rainfall it receives, 700 mm, gives it an estimated annual flow of 12 hm³.

The Zolina reservoir, a former artificial leachate deposit from the disappeared potash mines, belongs to the Sadar basin, although, due to the concentration of salts, its waters and sludge are kept confined within its containment dike. Although of artificial origin, the reservoir is being colonised by species typical of halophilic environments, which make it of environmental interest. The Góngora Waste Treatment Centre also belongs to the Sadar basin. In this case, its waters have been channelled and are taken directly to the Arazuri treatment plant.

The Sadar is a small river, with a low flow, which is very well embedded in the terrain and hardly presents any flooding problems. Its course, including its banks, has an average width of some 6–8 metres.

In Pamplona, where it runs for approximately 3.7 km, it crosses the campuses of the Public University of Navarre and the University of Navarre and flows into the River Elorz.

== Projects of interest ==
The Sadar River is one of the watercourses integrated within the Pamplona River Park. It is popularly known as the River in reverse, perhaps because it carries more water at the beginning than at the end, or perhaps because it flows in an east–west direction, which is the opposite of what is usual in the rest of the rivers in the Mediterranean Basin.

This river has also been the target of projects such as "Sadar Conecta" or "Equilibrium, preservation and conservation of the natural environment of the Pamplona campus" ("Equilibrio, preservación y conservación del entorno natural del campus de Pamplona"), in which various organisations have participated with the aim of preserving the nature around the river.

In 2019, the Public University of Navarre carried out a project to preserve the environment of this river, installing information panels on the fauna and flora that surrounds it as it passes through the Arrosadía university campus in Pamplona, as well as carrying out a clean-up of the river banks.
