= Urroz =

Urroz may refer to:

== People ==
- Alberto Urroz (born 1970), Spanish pianist
- Eduardo Urroz (born 1967), Nicaraguan football player
- Eloy Urroz (born 1967), Mexican writer
- Francisco Urroz (footballer) (1920–1992), Chilean football player
- Manuela Urroz (born 1991), Chilean field hockey player

== Places ==
- Urroz, Navarre, Spain
