= Pamplona =

Pamplona / Iruña Pamplona (Spanish) Iruña (Basque) Pampeluna
- Municipality
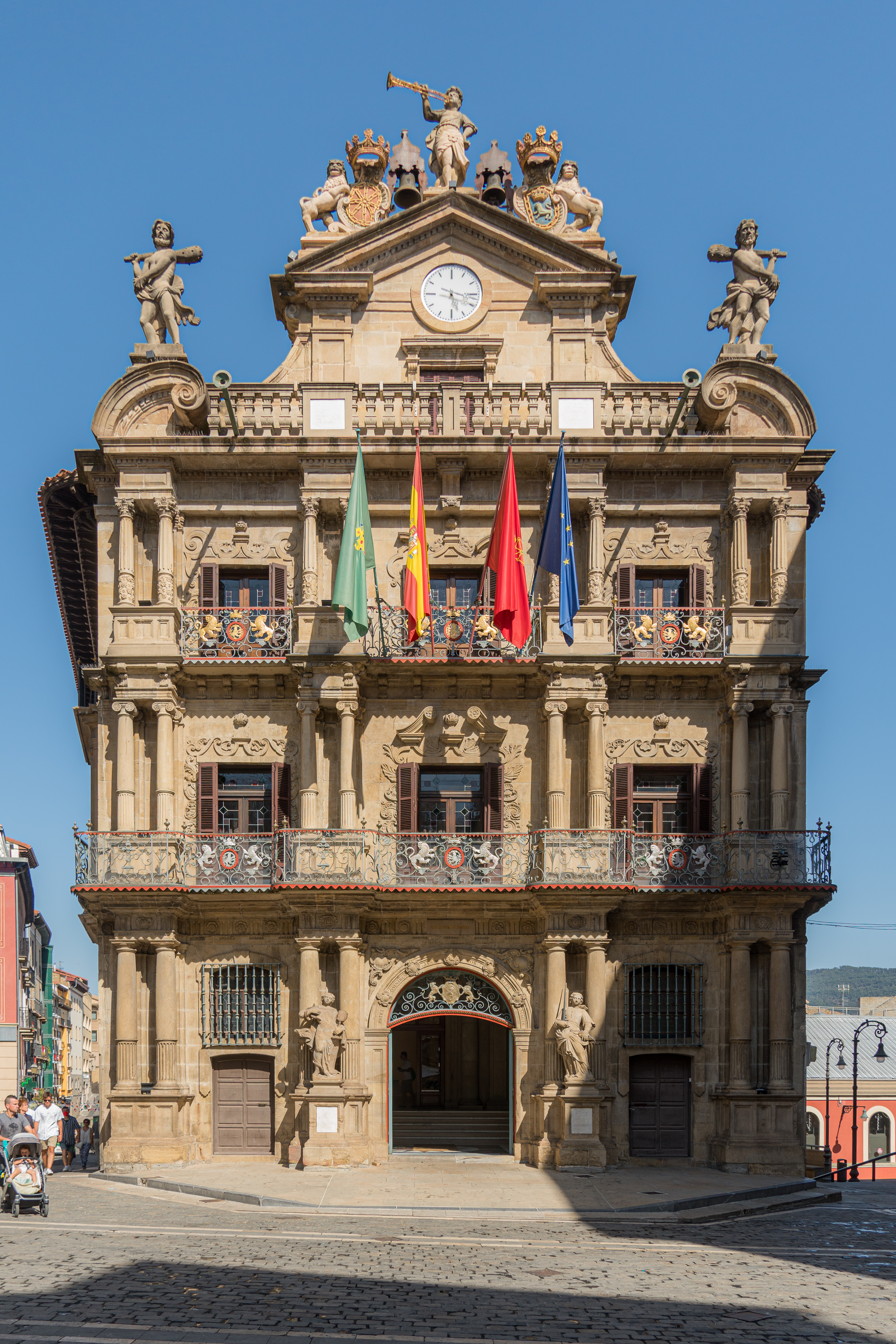
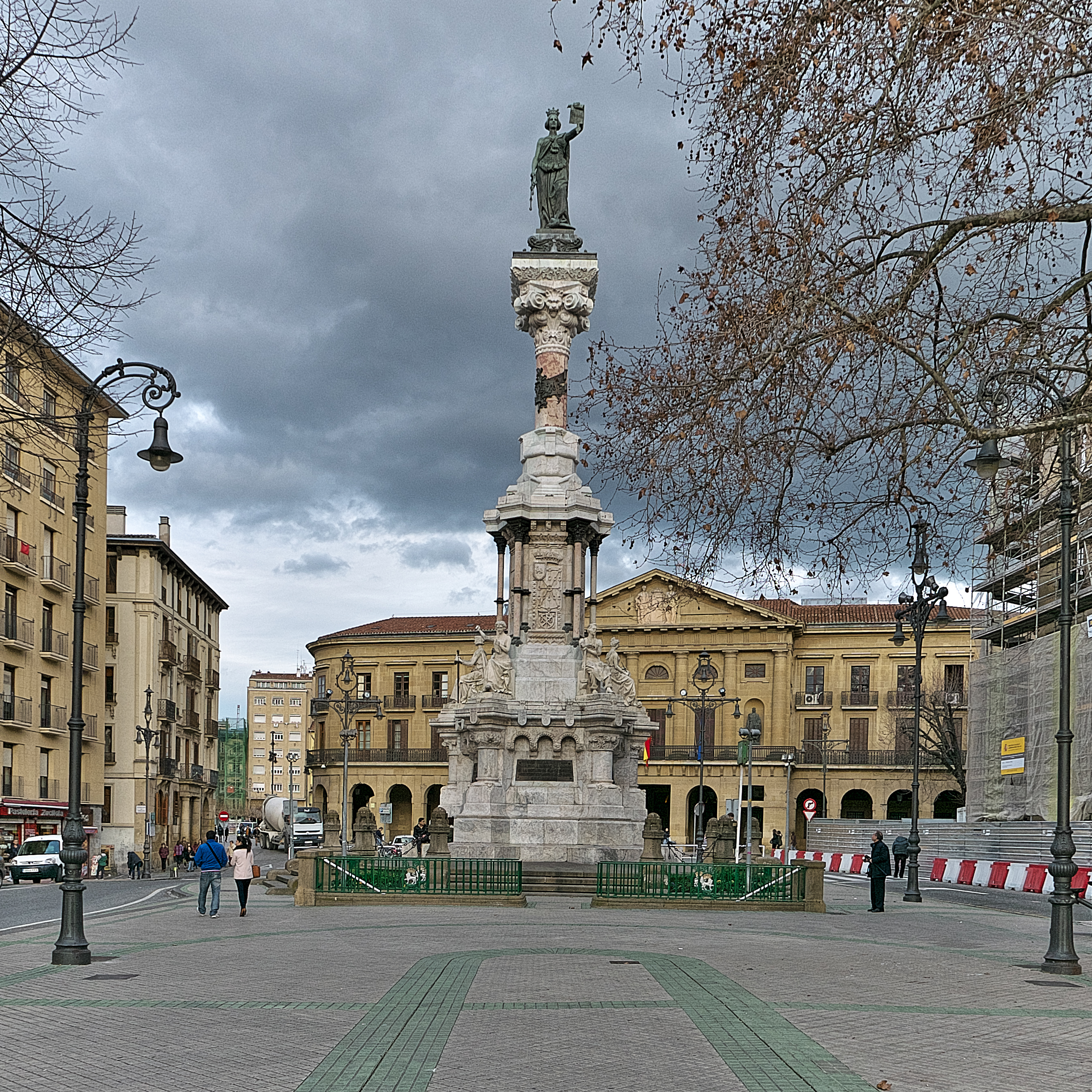
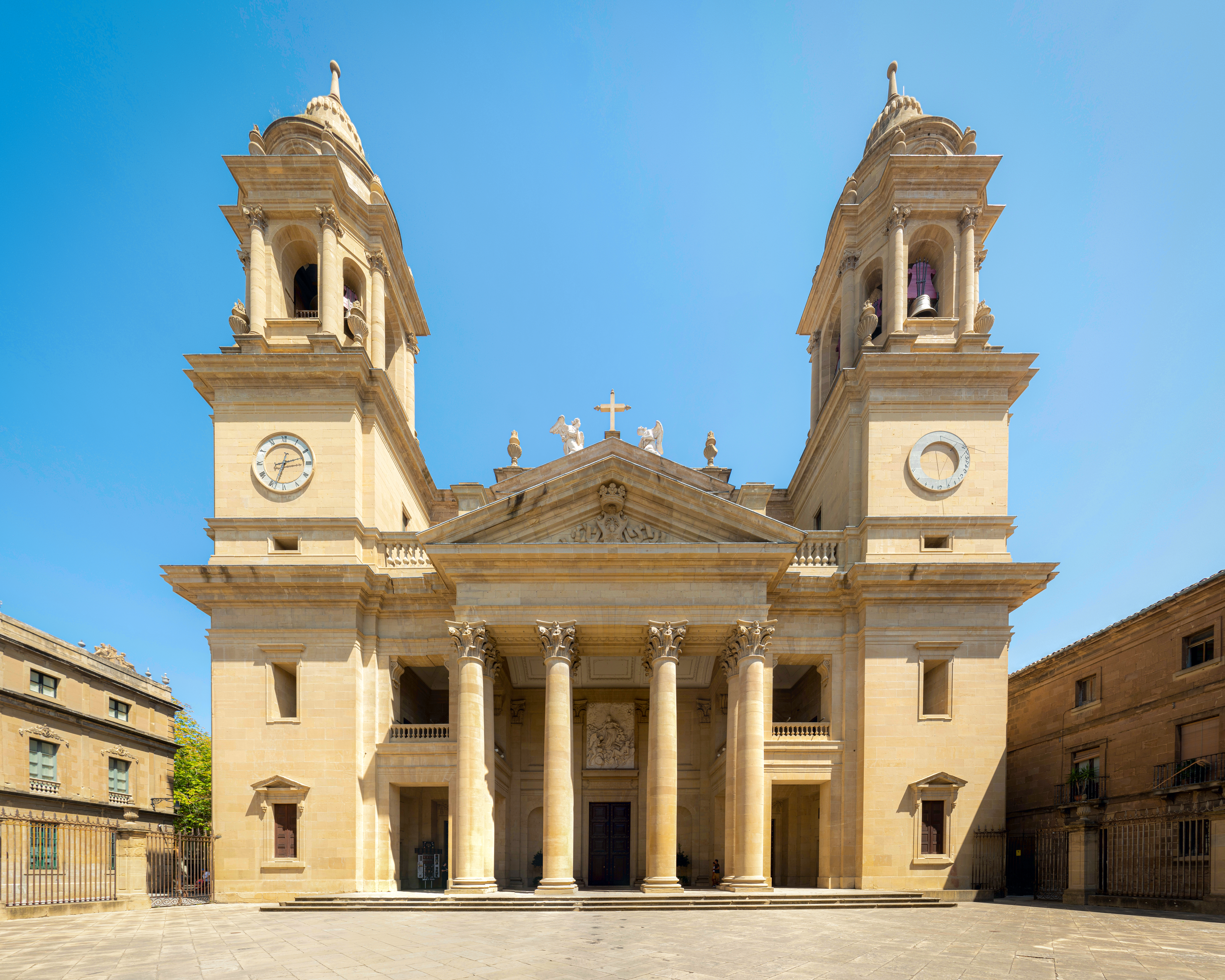
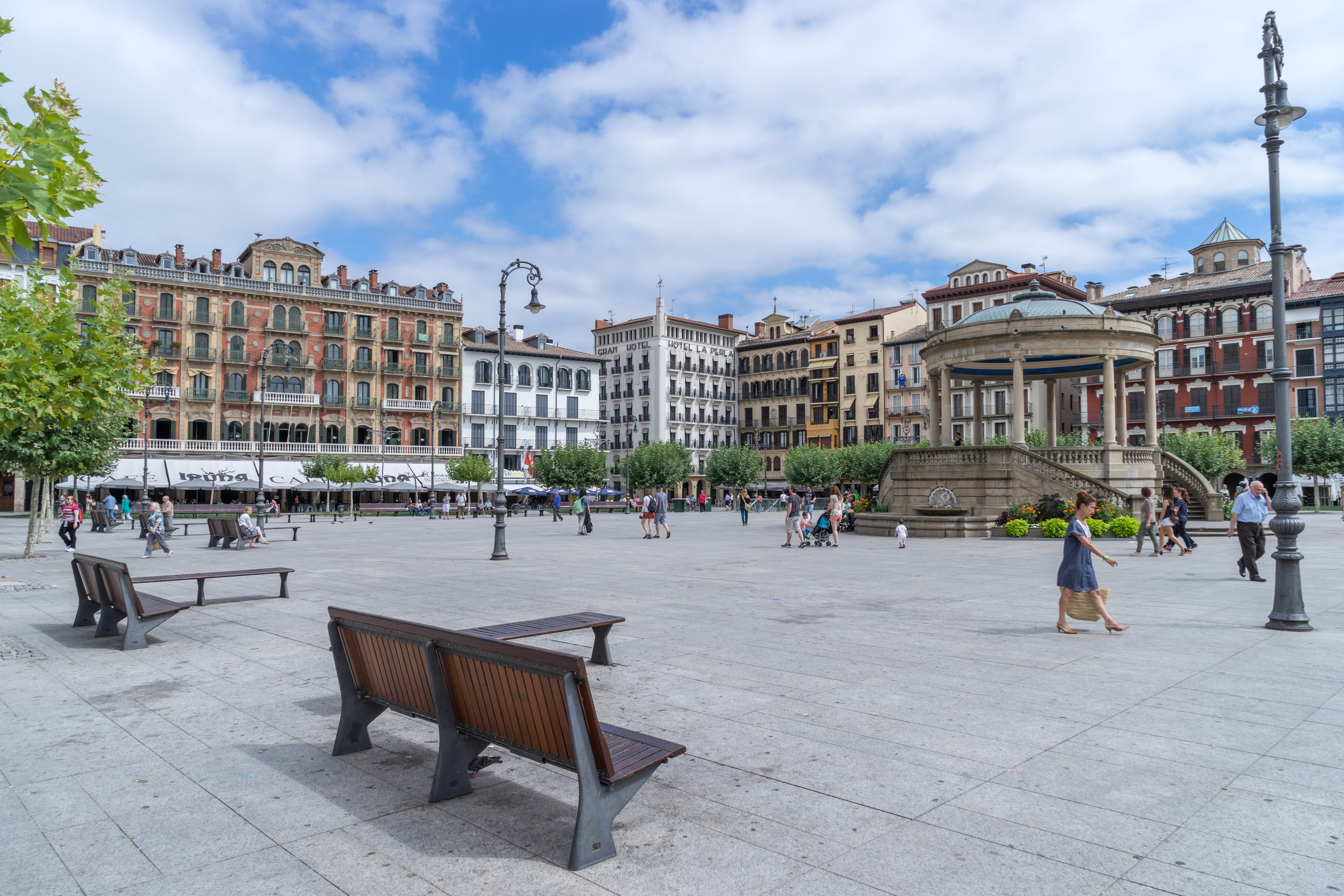
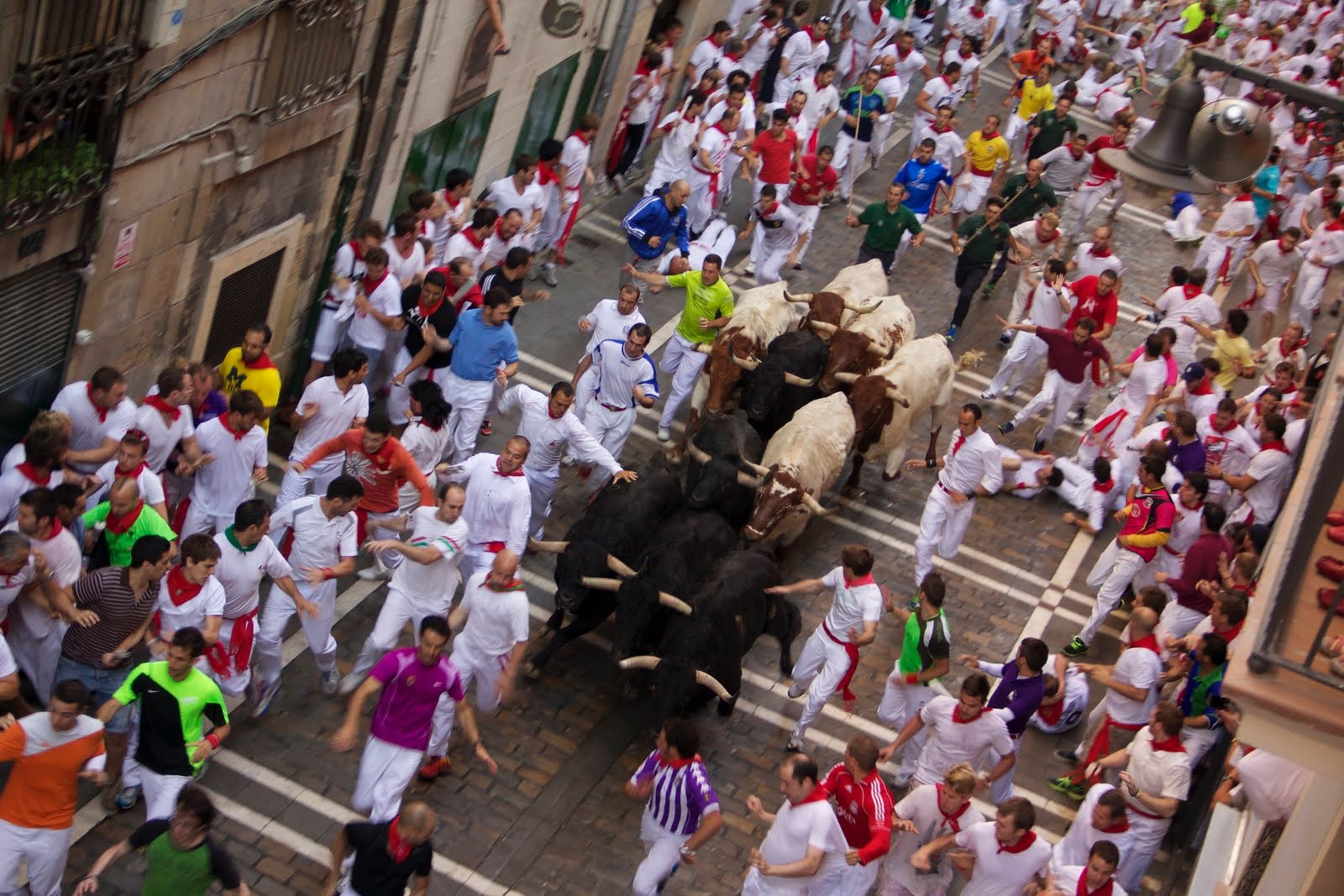
- Pamplona City Hall Fueros monument Cathedral Plaza del Castillo Festival of San Fermín

- Flag Coat of arms

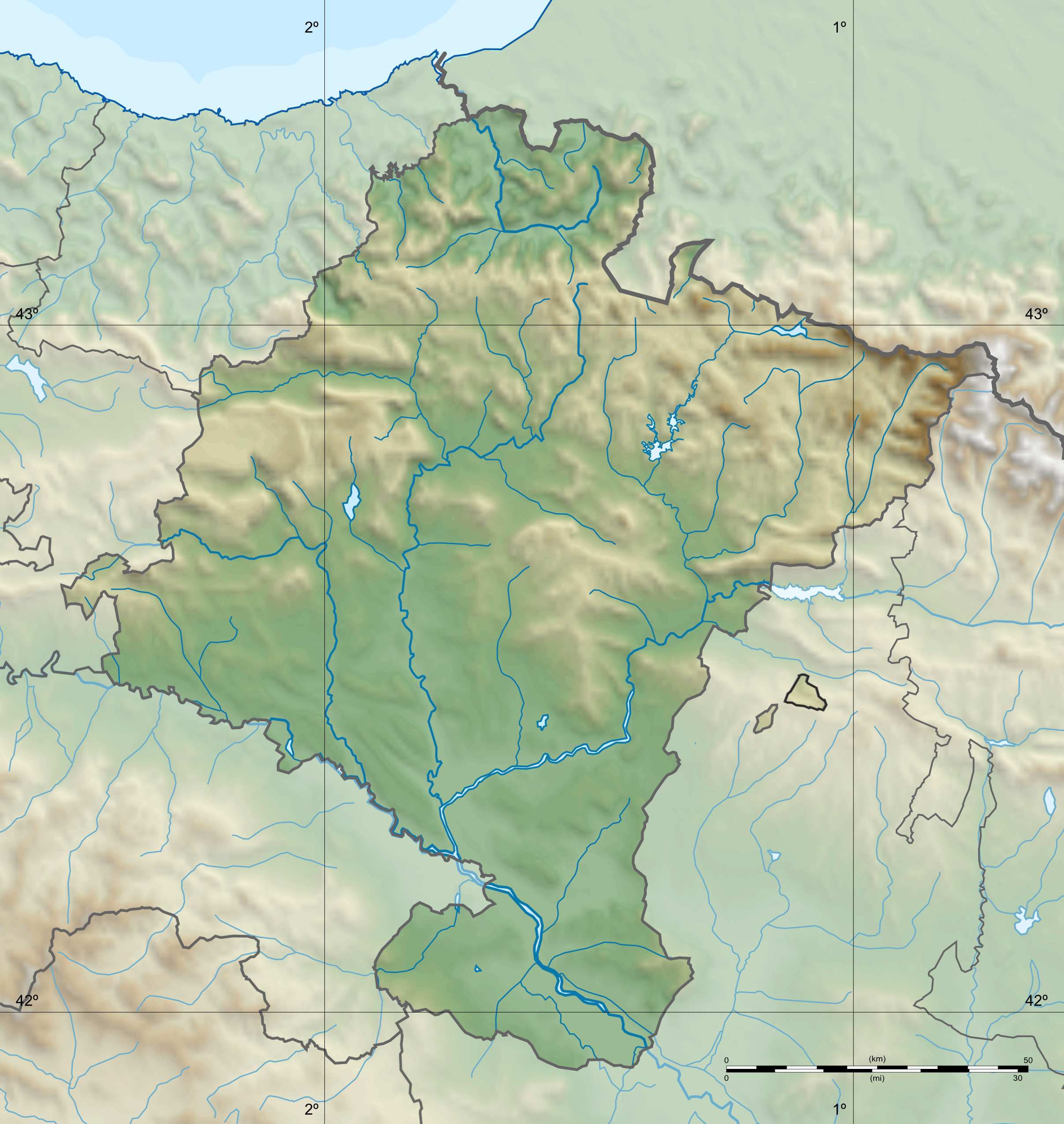
- Location of Pamplona within Spain Location of Pamplona within Navarre
- Coordinates: 42°49′N 1°39′W
- Country: Spain
- Autonomous Community: Navarre
- Comarca: Cuenca de Pamplona
- Founded: 74 BC

Government
  - Mayor: Joseba Asirón (EH Bildu)

Area
  - Municipality: 25.14 km^{2} (9.71 sq mi)
- Elevation: 450 m (1,480 ft)

Population (2025)
  - Municipality: 209,676
  - Density: 8,340/km^{2} (21,600/sq mi)
  - Metro: 319,208
- population-ranking: 29th (municipality); 23rd (metro area)
- Demonym(s): pamplonés, -a, pamplonica (Spanish) iruindar (Basque)

GDP
  - Metro: €18.942 billion (2020)
- Time zone: UTC+1 (CET)
  - Summer (DST): UTC+2 (CEST)
- Patron saint: Saint Saturnin, 29 November; Saint Fermin, 6–14 July, 25 September
- Website: www.pamplona.es

Pamplona (Spanish: [pamˈplona]; Basque: Iruña [i.ɾuɲa]; officially in its bilingual form: Pamplona-Iruña), (Note: Iruñea is the Basque name proposed by the Royal Academy of the Basque Language, but the Basque name recognized by the Government of Navarre is Iruña.) historically also known as Pampeluna in English, is the capital city of the Chartered Community of Navarre in Spain. As of 2024, with a population of 208,243, it is the 29th largest city in Spain.

Lying at near 450 m (1,480 ft) above sea level, the city (and the wider Cuenca de Pamplona) is located on the flood plain of the Arga river, a second-order tributary of the Ebro. Precipitation-wise, it is located in a transitional location between the rainy Atlantic northern façade of the Iberian Peninsula and its drier inland. Early population in the settlement traces back to the late Bronze to early Iron Age, even if the traditional inception date refers to the foundation of Pompaelo by Pompey during the Sertorian Wars circa 75 BC. During Visigothic rule Pamplona became an episcopal see, serving as a staging ground for the Christianization of the area. It later became one of the capitals of the Kingdom of Pamplona/Navarre.

The city is famous worldwide for the running of the bulls during the San Fermín festival, which is held annually from 6 July to 14 July. This festival was brought to literary renown with the 1926 publication of Ernest Hemingway's novel The Sun Also Rises. It is also home to Osasuna, the only Navarrese football club to have ever played in the Spanish top division.

== History ==
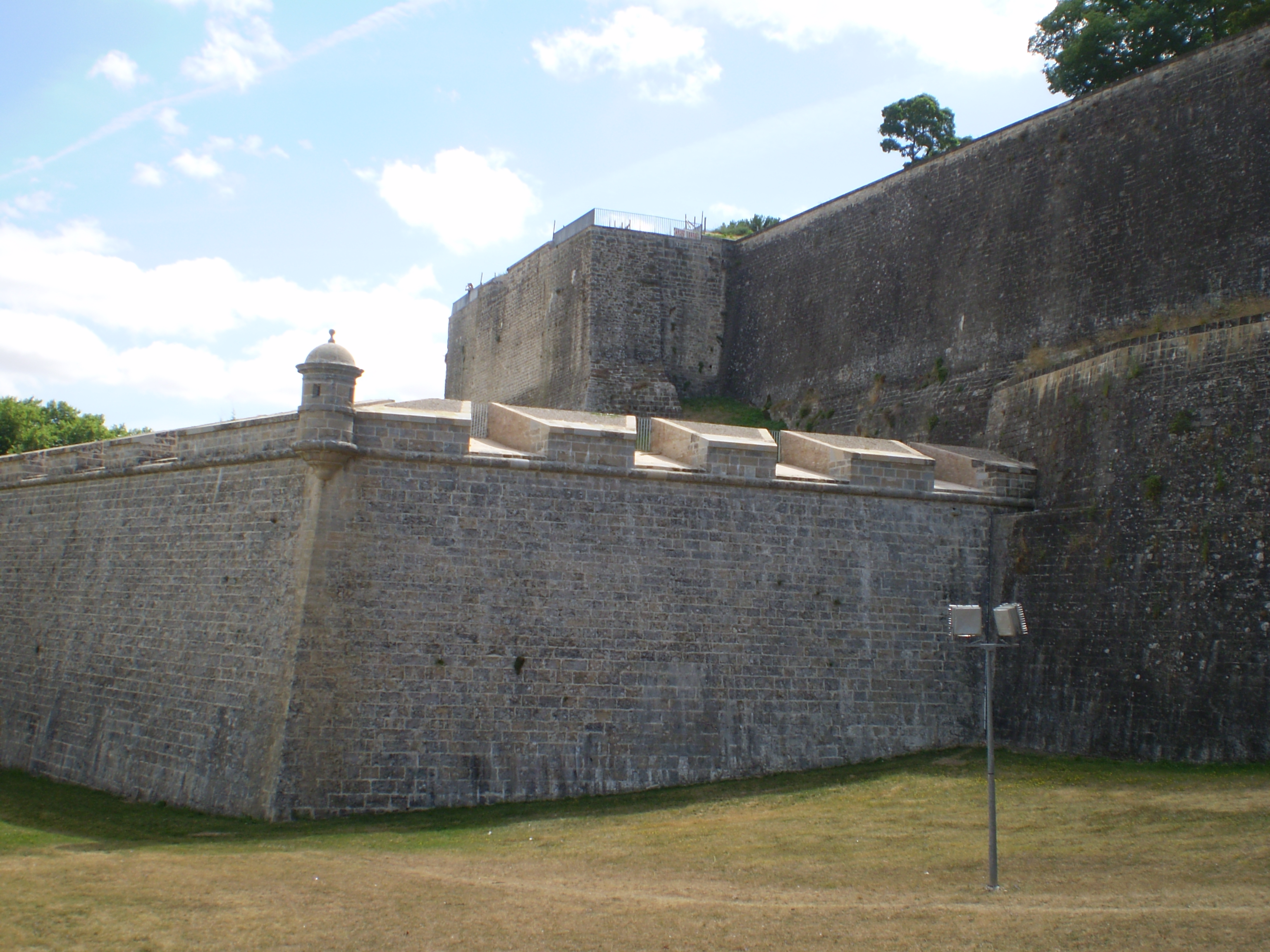
The city walls of Pamplona

=== Foundation and Roman times ===
In the winter of 75–74 BC, the area served as a camp for the Roman general Pompey in the war against Sertorius. He is considered to be the founder of Pompaelo, "as if Pompeiopolis" in Strabo's words, which became Pamplona, in modern Spanish. However, in later times, it has been discovered to be the chief town of the Vascones. They called it Iruña, translating to 'the city'. Roman Pompaelo was located in the province of Hispania Tarraconensis, on the Ab Asturica Burdigalam, the road from Burdigala (modern Bordeaux) to Asturica (modern Astorga); it was a civitas stipendiaria in the jurisdiction of the conventus of Caesaraugusta (modern Zaragoza).

=== Early Middle Ages ===
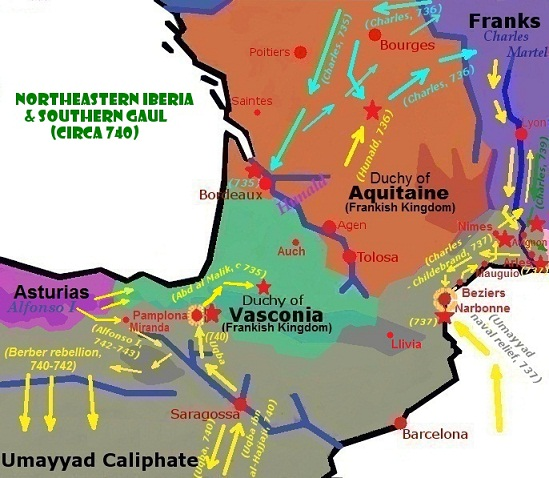
Pamplona, at the centre of numerous military campaigns during the eighth century

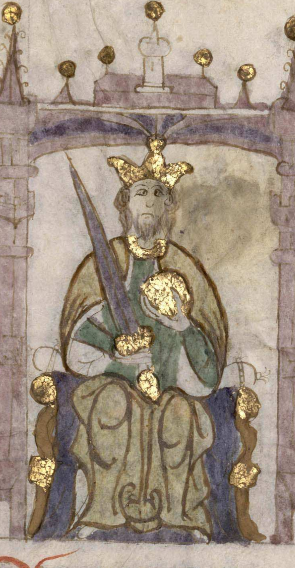
Eneko Arista, first king of Pamplona (15th-century miniature from Madrid, Biblioteca Nacional de España, MS 7415)

During the Germanic invasions of 409 and later as a result of Rechiar's ravaging, Pamplona went through much disruption and destruction, starting a cycle of general decline along with other towns across the Basque territory, but managing to keep some sort of urban life. During the Visigothic period (fifth to eighth centuries), Pamplona alternated between self-rule, Visigoth domination or Frankish suzerainty in the Duchy of Vasconia (Councils of Toledo unattended by several Pamplonese bishops between 589 and 684). In 466 to 472, Pamplona was conquered by the Visigoth count Gauteric, but they seemed to abandon the restless position soon, struggling as the Visigoth kingdom was to survive and rearrange its lands after their defeats in Gaul. During the beginning of the sixth century, Pamplona probably stuck to an unstable self-rule, but in 541, Pamplona, along with other northern Iberian cities, was raided by the Franks.

Around 581, the Visigoth king Liuvigild overcame the Basques, seized Pamplona and founded the town of Victoriacum. Despite the legend citing Saint Fermin as the first bishop of Pamplona and his baptising of 40,000 pagan inhabitants in just three days, the first reliable accounts of a bishop date from 589, when bishop Liliolus attended the Third Council of Toledo. After 684 and 693, a bishop called Opilano is mentioned again in 829, followed by Wiliesind and a certain Jimenez from 880 to 890. Even in the 10th century, important gaps are found in bishop succession, which are recorded unbroken only after 1005.

At the time of the Umayyad invasion in 711, the Visigothic king Roderic was fighting the Basques in Pamplona and had to turn his attention to the new enemy coming from the south. By 714–16, the Umayyad troops had reached the Basque-held Pamplona, with the town submitting apparently after a treaty was brokered between the inhabitants and the Arab military commanders. The position was then garrisoned by Berbers, who were stationed on the outside of the actual fortress, and established the cemetery unearthed not long ago at the Castle Square (Plaza del Castillo). In the following years, the Basques south of the Pyrenees do not seem to have shown much resistance to the Moorish thrust, and Pamplona may even have flourished as a launching point and centre of assembly for their expeditions into Gascony. In 740, the Wali (governor) Uqba ibn al-Hajjaj imposed direct central Cordovan discipline on the city. In 755, though, the last governor of Al-Andalus, Yusuf al Fihri, sent an expedition north to quash Basque unrest near Pamplona, resulting in the defeat of the Arab army.

From 755 until 781, Pamplona remained autonomous, probably relying on regional alliances. Although sources are not clear, it seems apparent that in 778, the town was in hands of a Basque local or a Muslim rebel faction loyal to the Franks at the moment of Charlemagne's crossing of the Pyrenees to the south. However, on his way back from the failed expedition to Saragossa in August, the walls and probably the town were destroyed by Charlemagne (ahead of the Frankish defeat in the famous Battle of Roncevaux), out of fear that the anti-Frankish party strong in the town might use the position against him. After Abd al-Rahman I's conquest, Pamplona and its hinterland remained in a state of shaky balance between Franks, regional Andalusian lords and central Cordovan rule, all of whom proved unable to permanently secure dominance over the Basque region. To a considerable extent, that alternation reflected the internal struggles of the Basque warrior nobility.

After the Frankish defeat at Roncevaux (778), Pamplona switched again to Cordovan rule, after Abd-al-Rahman's expedition captured the stronghold in 781. A wali or governor was imposed, Mutarrif ibn-Musa (a Banu-Qasi) up to the 799 rebellion. In that year, the Pamplonese—possibly led by a certain Velasko—stirred against their governor, but later the inhabitants provided some support for the Banu Qasi Fortun ibn-Musa's uprising. This regional revolt was shortly after suppressed by the Cordovan emir Hisham I, who re-established order, but failed to retain his grip on the town, since the Pamplonese returned to Frankish suzerainty in 806. A Muslim cemetery containing about 200 human remains mingled with Christian tombs was unearthed in 2003 at the Castle Square, bearing witness to an important Muslim presence in the city during this period, but further research was stopped by the destruction of this and other historic evidence as decided by the city council, headed by mayor Yolanda Barcina.

Following a failed expedition to the town led by Louis the Pious around 812, allegiance to the Franks collapsed after Enecco Arista rose to prominence. Moreover, he was crowned as king of Pamplona in 824, when the Banu Qasi and he gained momentum in the wake of their victorious second battle of Roncevaux. The new kingdom, inextricably linked to the Banu Qasi of Tudela, strengthened its independence from the weakened Frankish empire and Cordoban emirate.

During this period, Pamplona was not properly a town, but just a kind of fortress. In 924, Cordovan sources describe Pamplona as "not being especially gifted by nature", with its inhabitants being poor, not eating enough, and dedicated to banditry. They are reported to speak Basque for the most part, which "makes them incomprehensible". On 24 July, after Christian troops and citizens fled, troops from Cordova sacked Pamplona, destroying houses and buildings including its celebrated church.

The town only regained its urban and human shape after the end of raids by Vikings and Andalusians on the province. Especially after 1083, traffic on the Way of St James brought prosperity and new cultures via travelers from north of the Pyrenees.

=== Three boroughs and one city ===
From the 11th century, reviving economic development allowed Pamplona to recover its urban life. The bishops of Pamplona recovered their ecclesiastical leading role; during the previous centuries, isolated monasteries, especially Leyre, had actually held the religious authority. The pilgrimages to Santiago de Compostela contributed to the revival of the commercial and cultural exchanges with Christian Europe beyond the Pyrenees. In the 12th century, the city enlarged with two new separate burgos (independent boroughs): San Cernín (Saint Saturnin) and San Nicolás; the population of local Navarrese mainly confined to the original urban nucleus, the Navarrería, was swelled by Occitan merchants and artisans.

The boroughs showed very distinct features both socially and culturally, and were almost always engaged in quarrels among themselves. The most dramatic episode was the burning of the borough San Nicolás in 1258 and the destruction of the Navarrería by the other two boroughs and the massacre of its population in 1276. The site was abandoned for nearly 50 years. With regards to the outer defence walls of the city, the southern side was the weakest flank of the city, and the Navarrese king Louis I built a castle in the early 14th century in the site known today as Plaza del Castillo (Castle Square).

Eventually, King Charles III decreed the unification of the boroughs in a single city in 1423. The feuds between boroughs had been partly ignited by disputes over the use of the gulf dividing the three boroughs, so after Charles III's unification, the gulf was filled and on its site a common space laid out on the present-day city hall. The walls dividing the boroughs were demolished.

During the late 15th century, Pamplona bore witness to power struggles between the Beaumont and Agramont confederacies and external military interventions. Several times, the stronghold was taken over by different factions and foreign forces, like the ones sent by Ferdinand II of Aragon. Queen Catherine I was a minor and often absent from Pamplona, but eventually she married John III in 1494, an event celebrated with joy in the city. However, Navarre continued divided.

Historically, a Jewish community existed in Pamplona. The first documentation of Jews in Pamplona dates to 958, when Hasdai Ibn Shaprut visited Pamplona on a diplomatic mission to meet with Sancho I. The Jews of Pamplona had an independent court system which enforced the Jewish system of halacha, or religious laws. In 1498, the Jewish population was either expelled or forced to convert to Christianity.

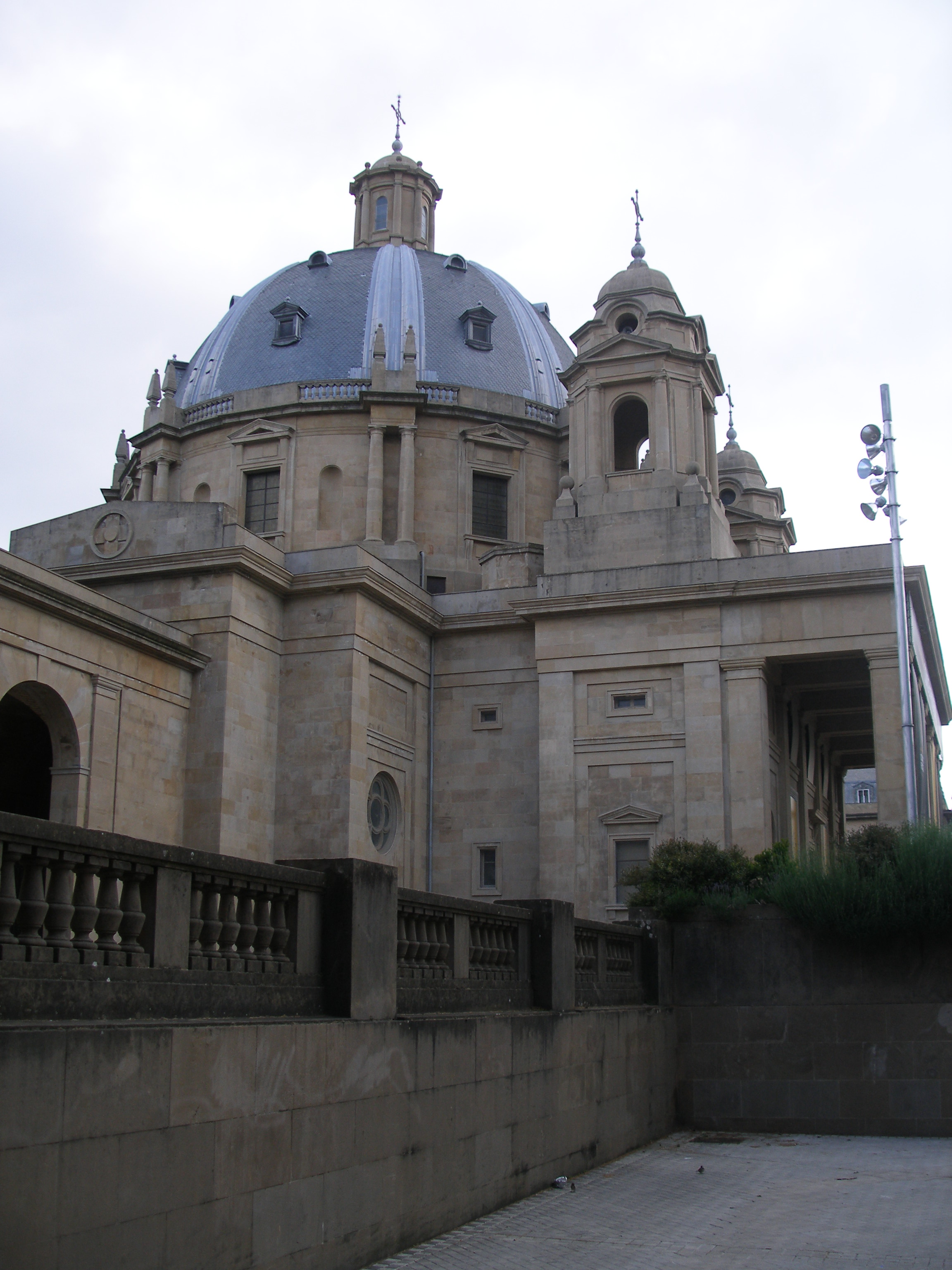
The Monumento a los Caídos, Francoist memorial, subject to debate about its potential demolition

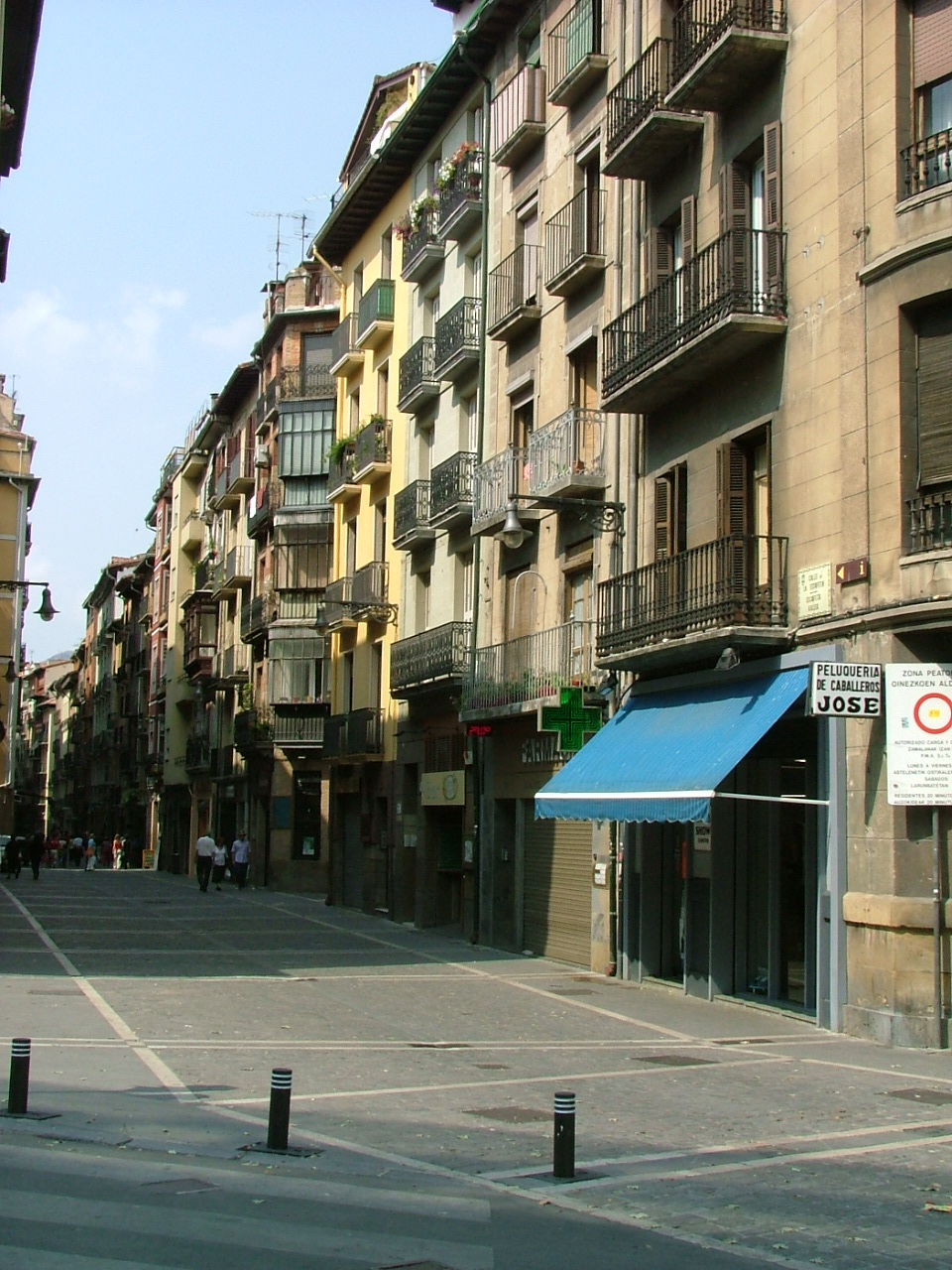
Estafeta Street

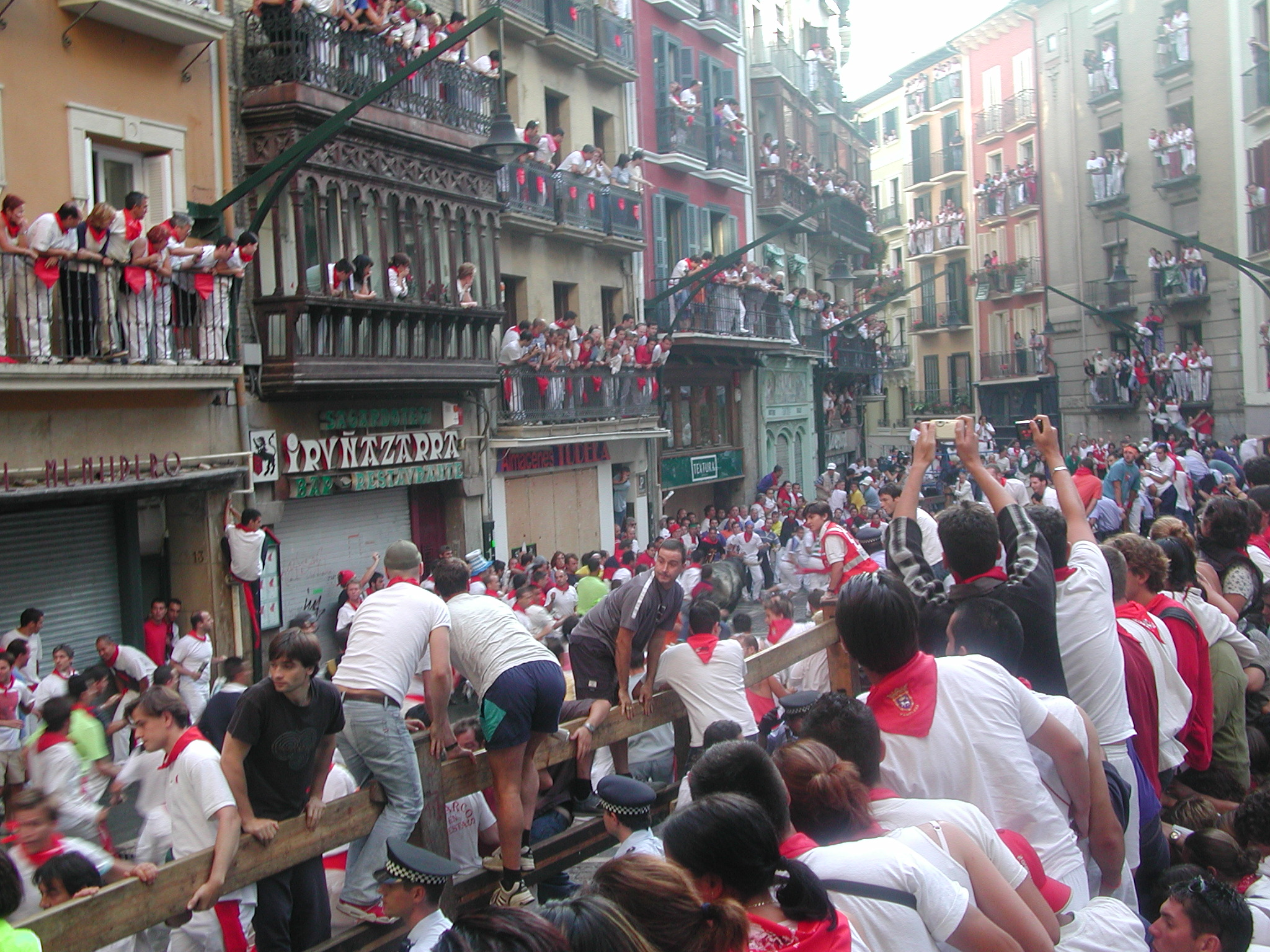
Running of the Bulls

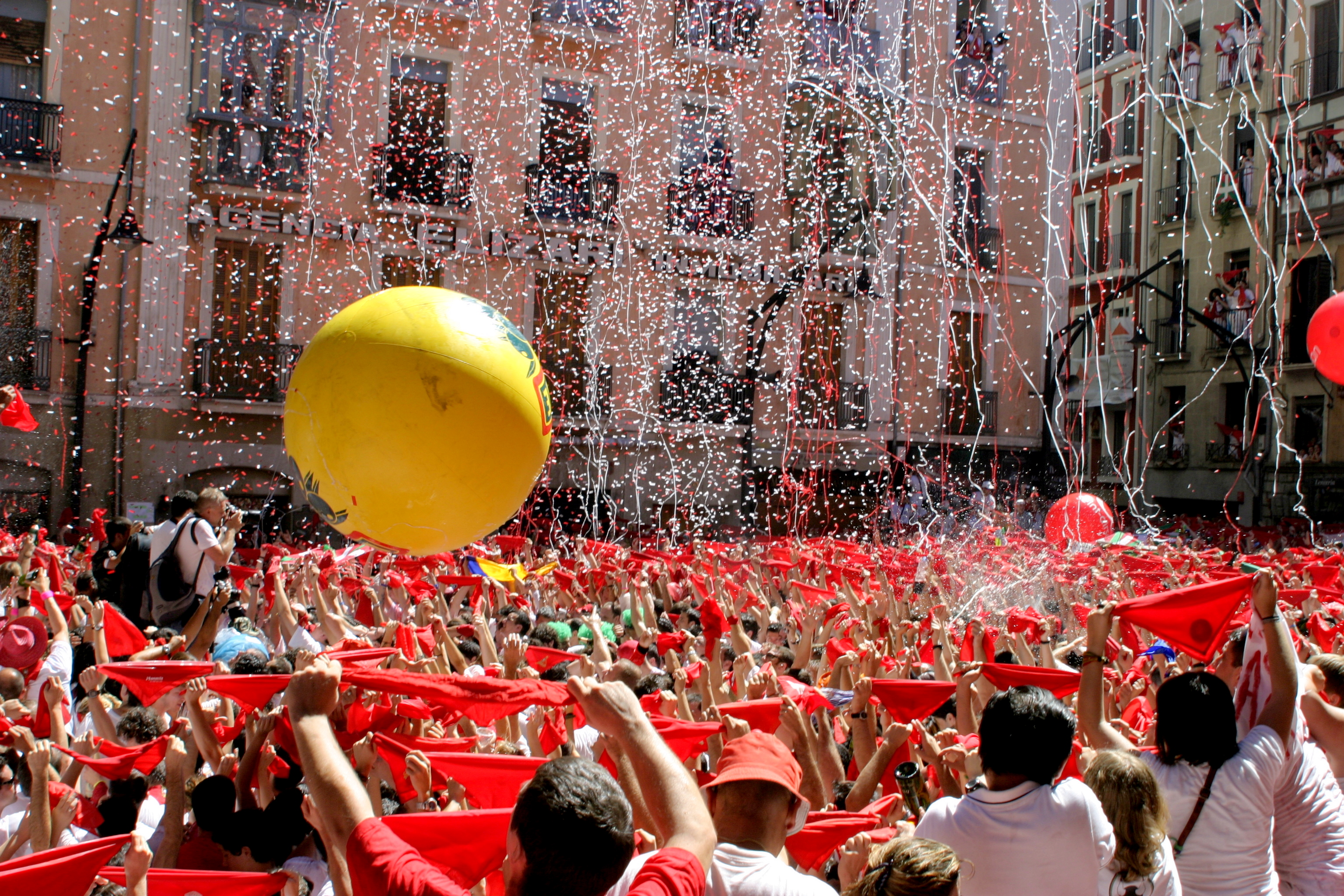
Seconds before the beginning of the San Fermín Festival—Town Hall Square: Everybody has a red handkerchief above their heads until a firework is exploded at 12 pm; putting it around their neck afterward

=== A fortress-city ===
After the 1512 conquest and annexation of Navarre to Spain, Pamplona remained as capital of the semiautonomous kingdom of Navarre, which preserved its own (reformed) institutions and laws. Pamplona became a Castilian-Spanish outpost at the foot of the western Pyrenees. After the Castilian conquest, king Ferdinand V ordered in 1513 the demolition and removal of the medieval castle and the city's monasteries, as well as the building of a new castle in a very close place. In 1530, with Navarre under Spanish military occupation, the Castilian viceroy was still expecting a "French invasion", and in fear of a possible revolt of the city dwellers, he requested an additional 1,000-strong force from what he called "healthy land", i.e. Castile, besides the 1,000 stationed already in Navarre.

The progress of artillery demanded a complete renewal of the fortified system. Starting in 1569, King Philip II built the fortifications at Pamplona, to designs by Giovan Giacomo Paleari and Vespasiano Gonzaga. The citadel in the south of the town is a pentagonal star fort. Phillip had the city bounded by walls that made it almost a regular pentagon. The modernization of the walls was intended mainly to keep locals in check and strengthen the outpost Pamplona had become on the border with independent Navarre, a close ally of France. The walls that exist today date from the late 16th to 18th centuries.

During the 18th century, Pamplona was considerably beautified and its urban services improved. A continuous water supply was established and the streets were paved, among many other enhancements. Rich aristocrats and businessmen also built their mansions. In the 19th century, this fortress-city played a key role in several wars in which Spain was involved.

During the Peninsular War of the Napoleonic Wars, French troops occupied the city - by launching a coup de main (surprise attack) and seized the city in 1808, and remained in it until the French forces were compelled to surrender on 31 October 1813 due to starvation, having been blockaded in the town for four months by the Spanish army under Enrique José O'Donnell.

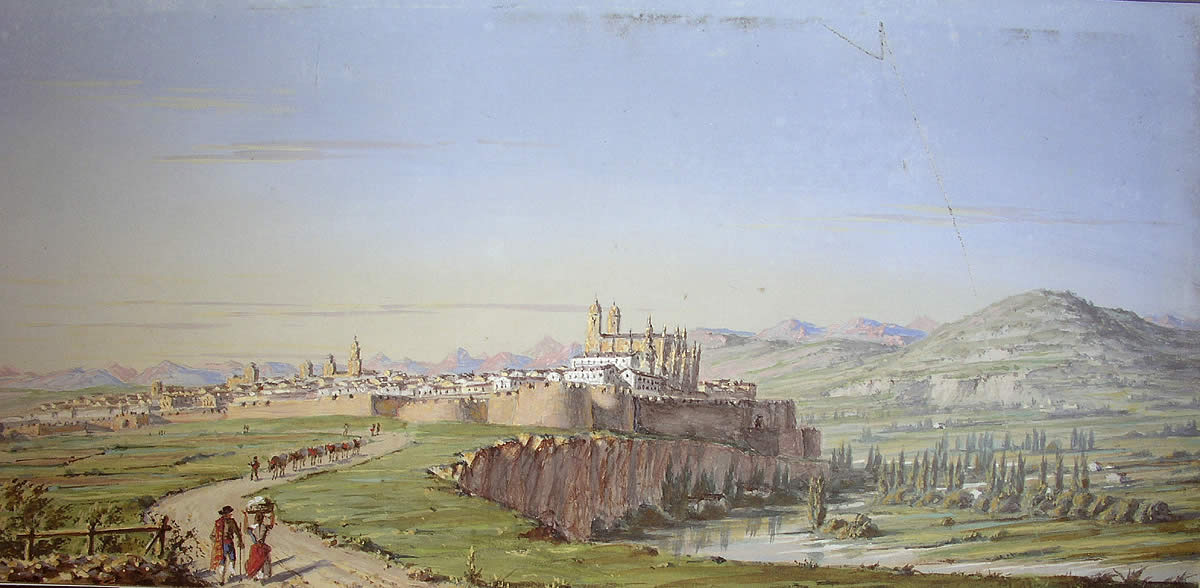
View of Pamplona during the 1850s

During the Carlist Wars (1833–1839 and 1872–1876) Pamplona was each time controlled by the liberals, not just because the few liberals that lived in Navarre were mainly Pamplonese, but also because of the governmental control over the fortified city. Although Carlist rebels easily ruled the countryside, the government army had no problem in dominating the walled capital of Navarre. Nevertheless, during the last Carlist war, modern artillery operated by Carlists from surrounding mountains showed that the old walls would not be enough in the face of a stronger enemy. Thus, the government decided to build a fort on the top of mount San Cristóbal, just 3 km (1.9 mi) north of Pamplona.

Due to its military role, the city could not grow outside its walled belt. Furthermore, building in the closest area to the walls was banned to avoid any advantage for a besieger; thus the city could only grow by increasing its housing density. Higher and narrower houses were built and courtyards gradually disappeared. During the 19th century, road transportation improved, and the railway came in 1860. Nevertheless, industry in Pamplona and Navarre as a whole was weak during the century of the Industrial Revolution. Basically, no industrial development was feasible in such a constrained fortress-city.

After a slight modification of the star fort allowed an expansion of just six blocks in 1888, the First World War demonstrated that the fortified system of Pamplona was already obsolete. In 1915, the Army allowed the destruction of the walls and abolished the building ban in the city's surroundings. The southern side of the walls was destroyed and the other three remained as they did not hinder urban growth. The star fort continued to serve as a military facility until 1964, but just as a garrison.

Pamplona has in recent years taken great care to integrate and preserve its fortifications for modern use. In October 2014, working with the city of Bayonne, Pamplona hosts an international conference 'Fortified Heritage: Management and Sustainable Development', the website is in English, French, and Spanish.

=== Industrialization and modernization ===
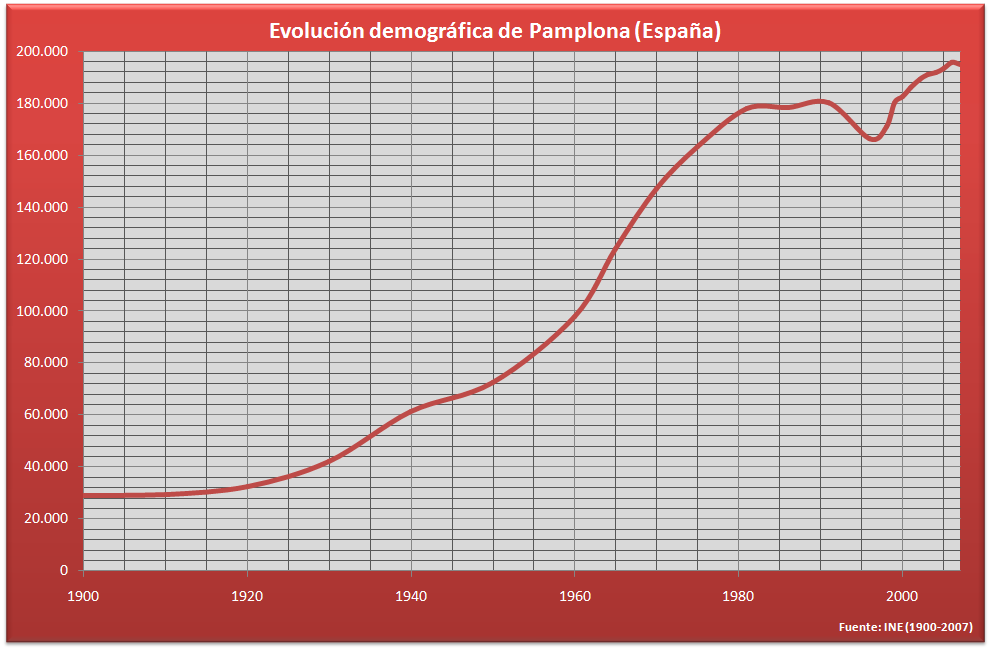
Demographic evolution (1900–2005)

Freed from its military function, Pamplona could lead the process of industrialization and modernization in which Navarre was involved during the 20th century, especially during its second half. The urban growth has been accompanied by the development of industry and services. Population growth has been the effect of an intense immigration process during the 1960s and 1970s: from the Navarrese countryside and from other less developed regions of Spain, mainly Castile and León and Andalusia. Since the 1990s the immigration is coming mainly from abroad.

Pamplona is listed as a city with one of the highest standards of living and quality of life in Spain. Its industry rate is higher than the national average, although it is threatened by delocalization. Crime statistics are lower than the national average but cost of living, especially housing, is considerably higher. Thanks to its small size and an acceptable public transport service, there are no major transport problems.

== Geography ==
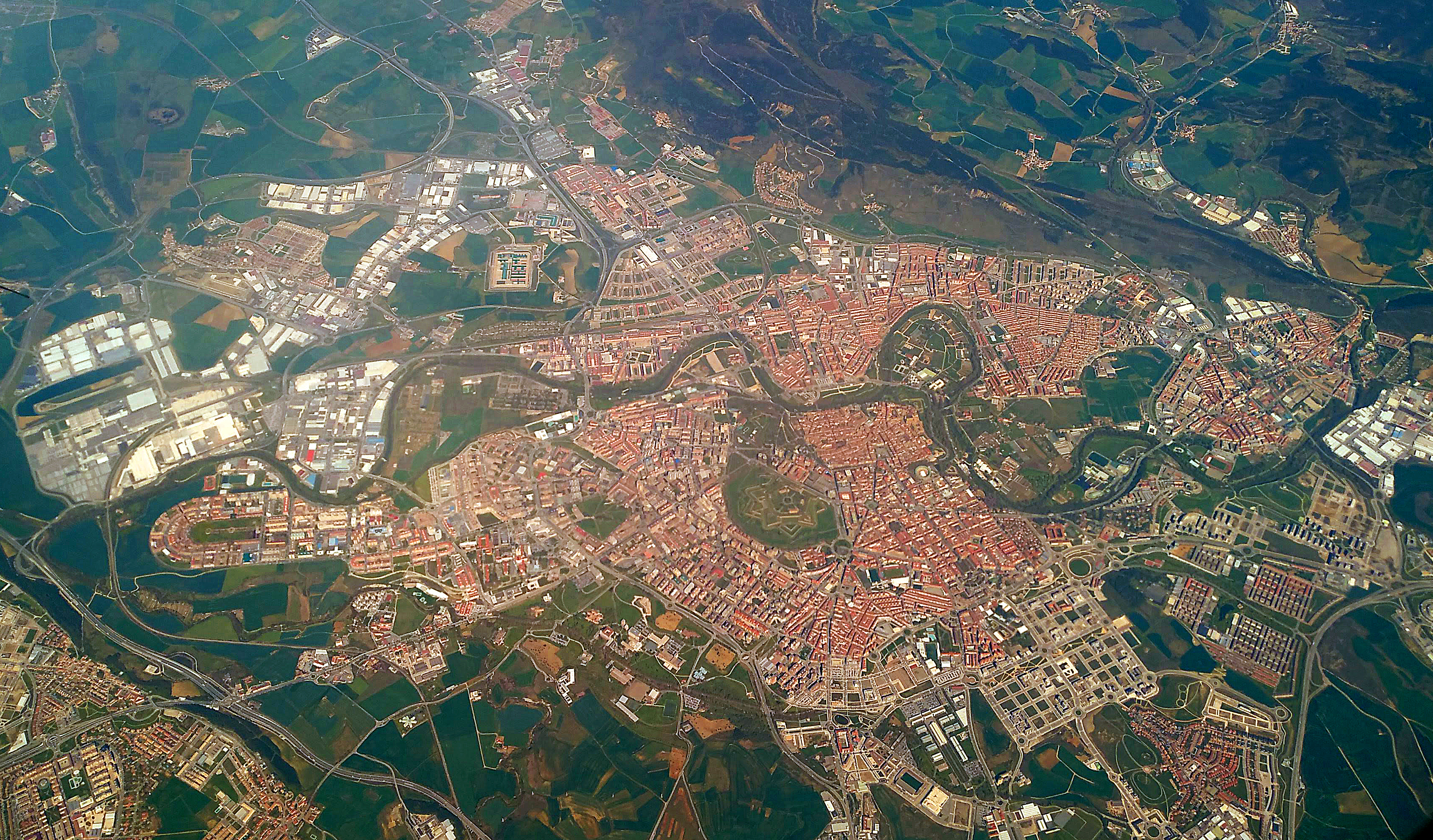
Aerial view of Pamplona, 2017

Pamplona is located in the middle of Navarre in a rounded valley, known as the Basin of Pamplona, that links the mountainous north with the Ebro valley. It is 92 km (57 mi) from the city of San Sebastián, 117 km (73 mi) from Bilbao, 735 km (457 mi) from Paris, and 407 km (253 mi) from Madrid. The climate and landscape of the basin is a transition between those two main Navarrese geographical regions. Its central position at crossroads has served as a commercial link between those very different natural parts of Navarre. The historical centre of the city is on the left bank of the Arga River, a tributary of the Ebro. The city has developed on both sides of the river.

=== Climate ===
The climate of Pamplona is classified as a humid subtropical climate (Köppen climate classification: Cfa). The city features a mediterranean rainfall pattern of drier summers which is similar to but not as pronounced as it is in the rest of Spain. Sunshine hours are typical for a location in Northern Spain, thus more similar to the oceanic coastal climate in nearby Basque locations than typical Spanish Mediterranean areas are, but rainfall is significantly lower than in Bilbao and especially San Sebastián, and the climate is harsher than in the northern coastal areas (colder winter lows, warmer summer highs) because of the altitude of 450 metres (1,480 ft) and its inland location.

Climate data for Pamplona (1991–2020), extremes (1953–2020)
Month	Jan	Feb	Mar	Apr	May	Jun	Jul	Aug	Sep	Oct	Nov	Dec	Year
Record high °C (°F)	19.5 (67.1)	23.6 (74.5)	30 (86)	29.6 (85.3)	33.5 (92.3)	38.5 (101.3)	42.3 (108.1)	40.6 (105.1)	38.8 (101.8)	30 (86)	27 (81)	20 (68)	42.3 (108.1)
Mean maximum °C (°F)	15.8 (60.4)	18.1 (64.6)	23.0 (73.4)	25.8 (78.4)	30.8 (87.4)	35.1 (95.2)	37.2 (99.0)	37.1 (98.8)	32.3 (90.1)	26.7 (80.1)	20.0 (68.0)	15.8 (60.4)	38.2 (100.8)
Mean daily maximum °C (°F)	9.5 (49.1)	11.2 (52.2)	15.0 (59.0)	17.2 (63.0)	21.4 (70.5)	25.8 (78.4)	28.5 (83.3)	29.2 (84.6)	24.8 (76.6)	19.7 (67.5)	13.2 (55.8)	9.9 (49.8)	18.8 (65.8)
Daily mean °C (°F)	5.7 (42.3)	6.5 (43.7)	9.5 (49.1)	11.5 (52.7)	15.2 (59.4)	19.1 (66.4)	21.6 (70.9)	22.1 (71.8)	18.5 (65.3)	14.5 (58.1)	9.2 (48.6)	6.1 (43.0)	13.3 (55.9)
Mean daily minimum °C (°F)	1.8 (35.2)	1.7 (35.1)	4.0 (39.2)	5.8 (42.4)	8.9 (48.0)	12.4 (54.3)	14.6 (58.3)	15.0 (59.0)	12.2 (54.0)	9.2 (48.6)	5.2 (41.4)	2.3 (36.1)	7.8 (46.0)
Mean minimum °C (°F)	−3.8 (25.2)	−3.4 (25.9)	−1.4 (29.5)	0.3 (32.5)	3.1 (37.6)	7.2 (45.0)	9.8 (49.6)	9.9 (49.8)	6.4 (43.5)	2.3 (36.1)	−1.3 (29.7)	−3.5 (25.7)	−5.2 (22.6)
Record low °C (°F)	−12.4 (9.7)	−15.2 (4.6)	−9.0 (15.8)	−2.2 (28.0)	−0.2 (31.6)	3.8 (38.8)	7.0 (44.6)	4.8 (40.6)	3.4 (38.1)	−1.0 (30.2)	−6.6 (20.1)	−14.2 (6.4)	−15.2 (4.6)
Average precipitation mm (inches)	73.5 (2.89)	56.8 (2.24)	65.5 (2.58)	72.1 (2.84)	60.6 (2.39)	55.2 (2.17)	33.6 (1.32)	32.9 (1.30)	46.2 (1.82)	66.8 (2.63)	85.6 (3.37)	71.2 (2.80)	720.1 (28.35)
Average precipitation days (≥ 1 mm)	10	9	9	11	10	6	4	4	7	10	11	12	103
Mean monthly sunshine hours	114	130	191	204	237	259	302	287	230	179	117	104	2,354
Source 1: Météo Climat
Source 2: Infoclimat

Climate data for Pamplona Airport(1981–2010), extremes (1953–2020)
Month	Jan	Feb	Mar	Apr	May	Jun	Jul	Aug	Sep	Oct	Nov	Dec	Year
Record high °C (°F)	19.5 (67.1)	23.6 (74.5)	30 (86)	29.6 (85.3)	33.5 (92.3)	38.5 (101.3)	40.2 (104.4)	40.6 (105.1)	38.8 (101.8)	30 (86)	27 (81)	20 (68)	40.6 (105.1)
Mean daily maximum °C (°F)	9.1 (48.4)	10.9 (51.6)	14.6 (58.3)	16.4 (61.5)	20.8 (69.4)	25.2 (77.4)	28.2 (82.8)	28.3 (82.9)	24.5 (76.1)	19.3 (66.7)	13.1 (55.6)	9.7 (49.5)	18.4 (65.1)
Daily mean °C (°F)	5.2 (41.4)	6.3 (43.3)	9.1 (48.4)	10.9 (51.6)	14.7 (58.5)	18.6 (65.5)	21.2 (70.2)	21.4 (70.5)	18.2 (64.8)	14.1 (57.4)	9.0 (48.2)	6.0 (42.8)	12.9 (55.2)
Mean daily minimum °C (°F)	1.4 (34.5)	1.6 (34.9)	3.7 (38.7)	5.3 (41.5)	8.6 (47.5)	11.9 (53.4)	14.2 (57.6)	14.5 (58.1)	12.0 (53.6)	8.9 (48.0)	4.8 (40.6)	2.2 (36.0)	7.4 (45.3)
Record low °C (°F)	−12.4 (9.7)	−15.2 (4.6)	−9.0 (15.8)	−2.2 (28.0)	−0.2 (31.6)	3.8 (38.8)	7.0 (44.6)	4.8 (40.6)	3.4 (38.1)	−1.0 (30.2)	−6.6 (20.1)	−14.2 (6.4)	−15.2 (4.6)
Average precipitation mm (inches)	62 (2.4)	55 (2.2)	59 (2.3)	79 (3.1)	65 (2.6)	51 (2.0)	38 (1.5)	43 (1.7)	49 (1.9)	73 (2.9)	80 (3.1)	77 (3.0)	734 (28.9)
Average precipitation days (≥ 1 mm)	8.7	8	7.7	9.7	9.2	5.8	4.3	4.7	5.7	8.6	9.6	10.1	92.1
Average snowy days	2	2.6	1.4	0.8	0	0	0	0	0	0	0.7	1.5	9
Average relative humidity (%)	78	72	66	65	63	59	57	58	62	69	76	78	67
Mean monthly sunshine hours	90.9	129.3	180.7	187.2	235.4	271.5	317.1	281.0	215.1	162.2	108.1	86.8	2,265.3
Source 1: Agencia Estatal de Meteorología
Source 2: Agencia Estatal de Meteorología

== Demographics ==
Historical population
Year	Pop.	±%
1842	11,675	—
1857	22,702	+94.4%
1877	28,463	+25.4%
1887	30,948	+8.7%
1900	30,609	−1.1%
1910	31,211	+2.0%
1920	33,281	+6.6%
1930	38,308	+15.1%
1940	52,743	+37.7%
1950	68,288	+29.5%
1960	93,429	+36.8%
1970	145,026	+55.2%
1981	177,906	+22.7%
1991	180,372	+1.4%
2001	183,964	+2.0%
2011	195,943	+6.5%
2021	203,596	+3.9%
Source: INE

As of 2024, the foreign-born population of the city is 45,079, making up 21.6% of the total population.

== Urbanism ==
Like many other European cities, it is very easy to distinguish what is so called the "old city" and the new neighborhoods. The oldest part of the old city is Navarrería, which corresponds with the Roman city. During the 12th century, the boroughs of Saint Sernin (San Saturnino or San Cernin) and Saint Nicholas (San Nicolás) were established. Charles III decreed the unification of the three places under a single municipality in 1423.

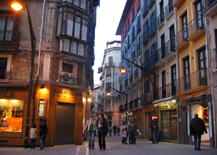
Old city of Pamplona

The city did not expand until the late 19th century. In 1888, a modest modification of the star fort was allowed, but it just permitted the building of six blocks. It was called the I Ensanche (literally, "first widening"). The southern walls were destroyed in 1915 and the II Ensanche ("second widening") was planned. Its plan followed the grid pattern model designed by Ildefons Cerdà for Barcelona. Its blocks were built between the 1920s and the 1950s. The prevailing housing model is apartment buildings of five to eight floors.

After the Civil War, three new zones of Pamplona began to grow: Rochapea, Milagrosa, and Chantrea. Only the last one was a planned neighborhood, the other two being disorderly growths. In 1957, the municipality designed the first general ordination plan for the city, which established the guidelines for further urban development. According to this, during the 1960s and 1970s saw the creation of new neighborhoods like San Juan, Iturrama, San Jorge, Etxabakoitz, and Orvina.

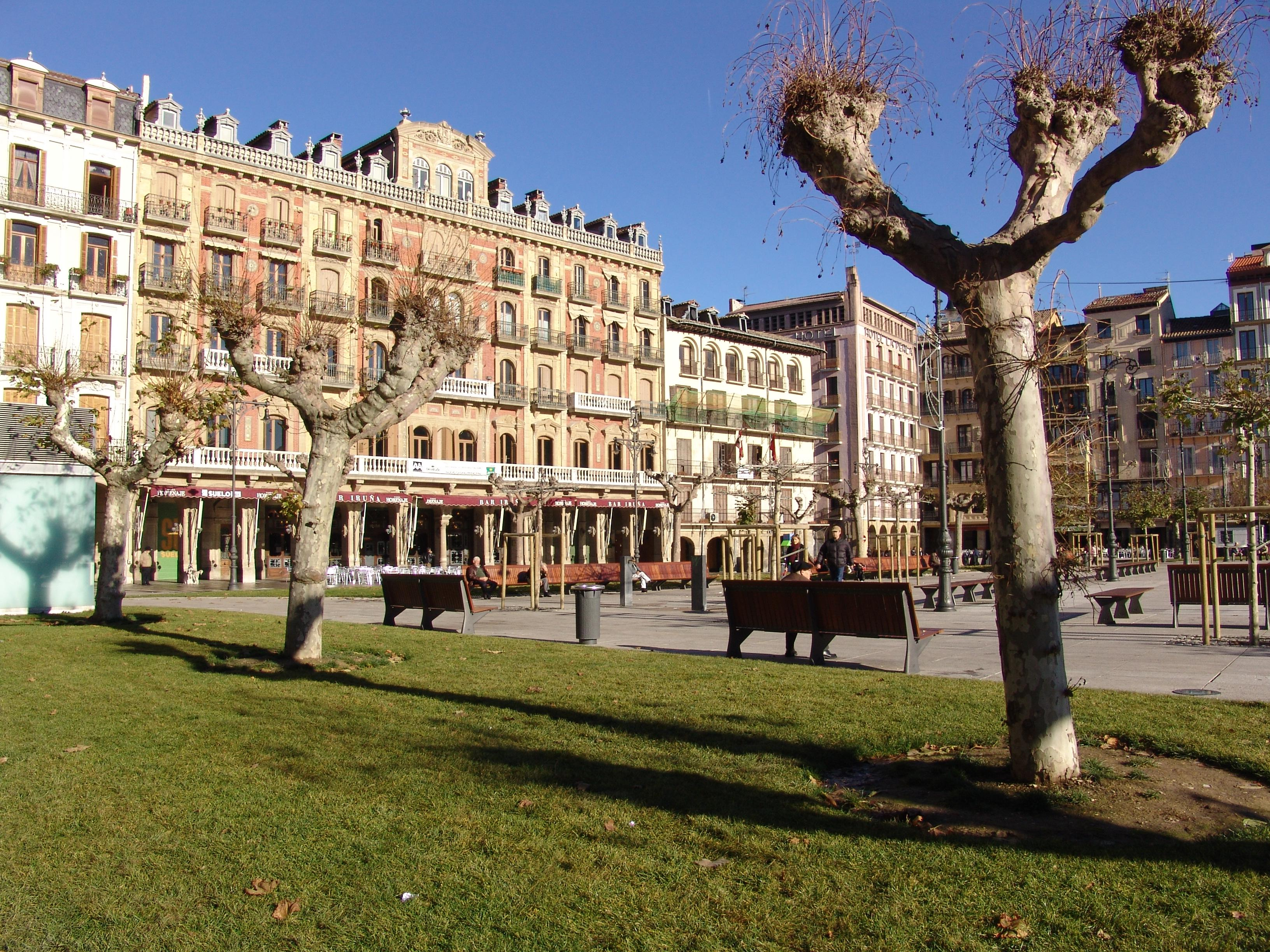
Plaza del Castillo with Hotel La Perla visible (to the left of the tree)

The urban expansion of Pamplona exceeded the administrative limits of the city and involved municipalities like Barañáin, Burlada, Villava, Ansoain, Berriozar, Noain or Huarte in a larger metropolitan area. During the 1980s and 1990s, new neighborhoods were born: Azpilagaña, Mendebaldea, and Mendillorri. Rochapea was profoundly renewed. The urban development of those new neighborhoods is very similar to other Spanish provincial capitals that experienced a similar aggressive economic development during the sixties and seventies. The urbanization of Pamplona, being from anterior designs, is not constrained by the grid plan. The apartment buildings are taller: never less than five floors and many taller than ten. Industry, which previously coexisted with housing, was moved to industrial parks (the oldest and the only one within municipal limits of Pamplona is Landaben).

In recent years, single-family house-predominant neighborhoods have grown in the metropolitan area: Zizur Mayor, Cizur Menor, Mutilva Alta, Mutilva Baja, Olaz, Esquíroz, Artica, Alzuza, Artiberri and Sarriguren. And new districts emerged like Buztintxuri, Lezkairu and Ripagaina, the latter two being still under construction. These new suburbs have more room for green areas and recreative parks.

== Economy ==
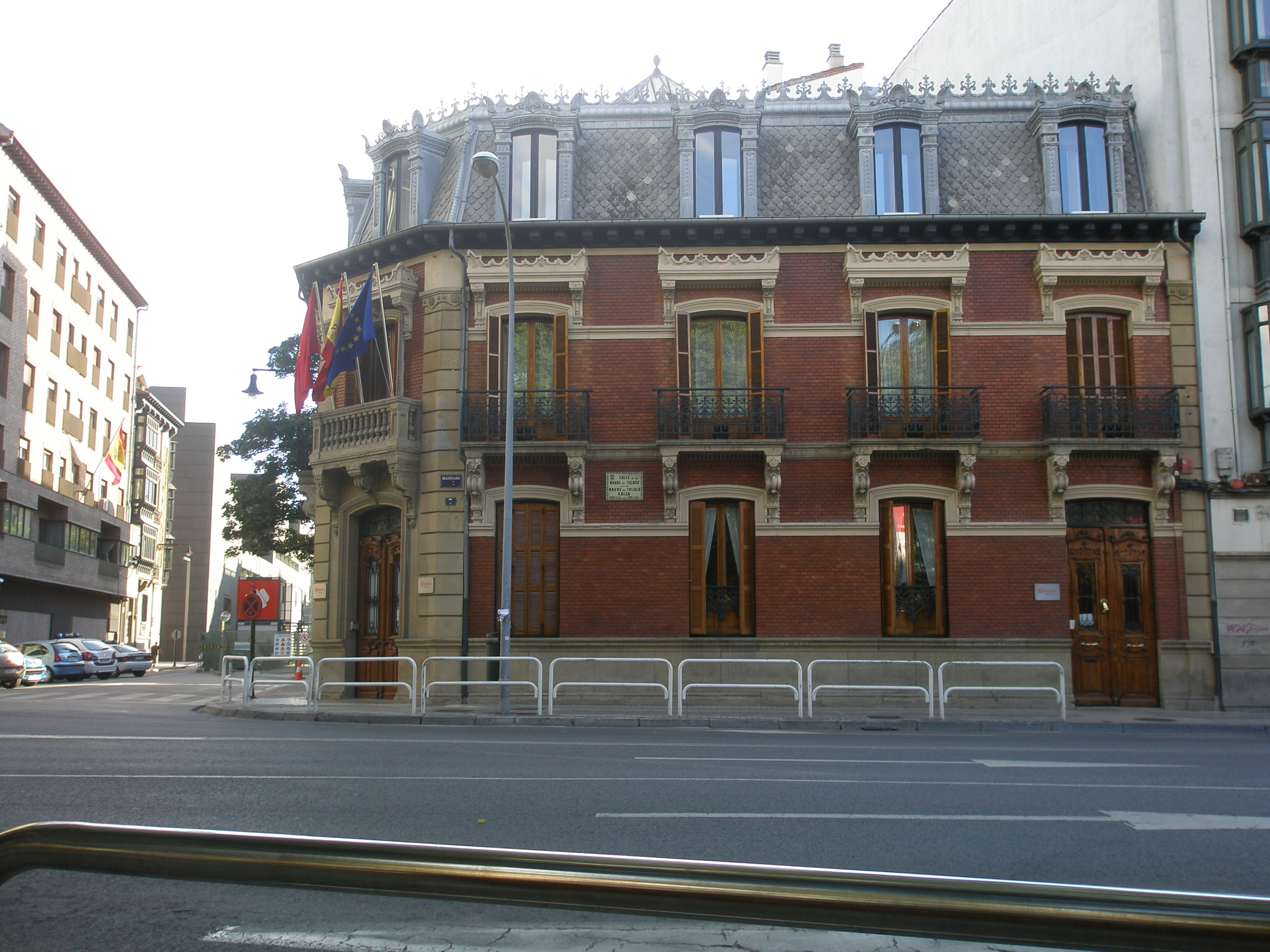
Burués building, current Chamber of Commerce of Navarra

Pamplona has shifted in a few decades from a little administrative and even rural town to a medium-size city of industry and services. The industry sector is diversified although the most important activity is related to automobile industry. The Landaben automotive plant opened in 1966, where Authi produced cars under license from British Motor Corporation. In 1975 the plant was bought by SEAT, which later became part of the Volkswagen Group in 1994. It produced over 8 million units of the Polo from 1984 to 2024, and currently produces the T-Cross and Taigo. The city has also many auxiliary industries that work for Volkswagen and other companies.

Other remarkable industries are building materials, metalworking and food processing. Renewable energy technologies are also an increasing economic sector (wind turbine manufacturing and generation) and neighboring Sarriguren is the seat of the Siemens Gamesa Renewable Energy, National Centre for Renewable Energies (CENER) and of Acciona Energía.

Pamplona is the main commercial and services centre of Navarre. Its area of influence is not beyond the province, except for the University of Navarre and its teaching hospital, which provide private educational and health services nationwide.

== Education ==
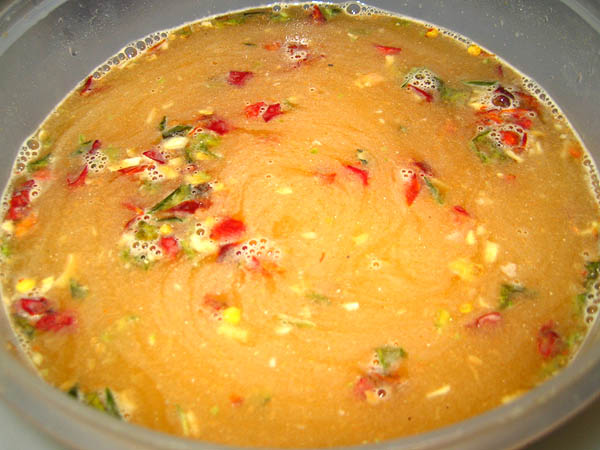
Cordero al chilindrón, a dish which originated in Pamplona

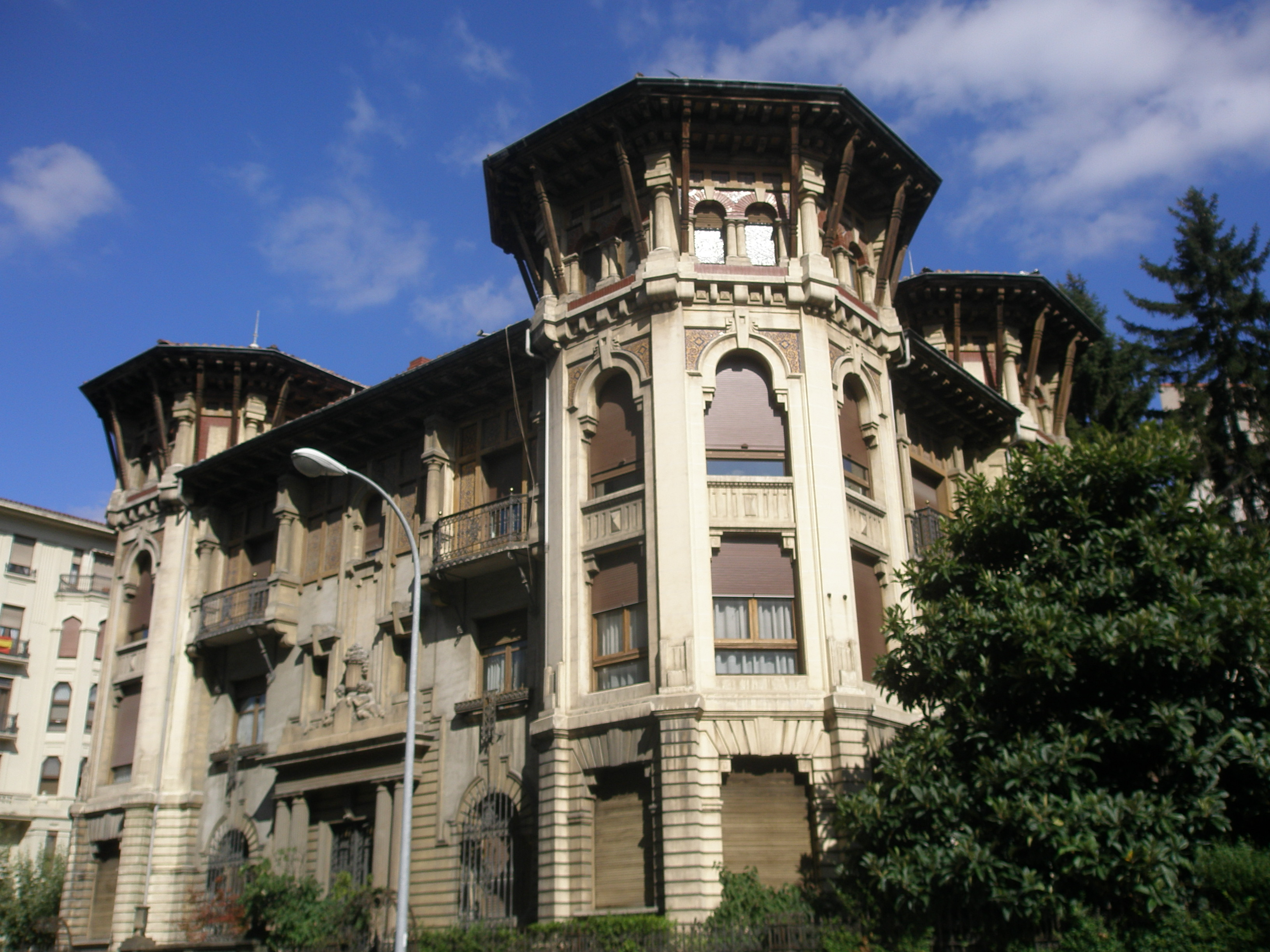
Casall Palace

The city is home to two universities: the above-mentioned University of Navarre, a corporate work of Opus Dei founded in 1952, which is ranked as the best private university in Spain, and the Public University of Navarre, established by the Government of Navarre in 1987. There is also a local branch of the UNED (Universidad Nacional de Educación a Distancia).

== Culture ==
The two most important museums in Pamplona are the Museo de Navarra, devoted to the archaeological and artistic heritage of Navarre, and the Museo Diocesano of religious art, located in the cathedral. Pamplona is the first Spanish city in the French way of the Way of Saint James.

Pamplona has hosted the Sarasate Violin International Competition biennially since 1991, and the annual Punto de Vista International Documentary Film Festival, the most important Spanish documentary film festival, since 2004.

One of the more popular cultural expressions include the "Gigantes", which come out during festivals many times during the year. These are approximately 30-foot wooden statues that have a person inside that make them dance around the city. They represent each of the main continents of the world, including Europe, the Americas, Africa, and Asia.

== Politics ==
Following the 2023 municipal election, the mayor of the city is Joseba Asiron (EH Bildu), also supported by the Socialist Party of Navarre, Geroa Bai, and Contigo Zurekin.

== Transport ==
Pamplona is linked by motorways with neighbouring Zaragoza (1978), San Sebastián, Vitoria (1995) and Logroño (2006). Since 2007 buses use a new bus station in the city centre that replaces the old one (1934).

The airport (1972), operated by Aena and located in Noain, schedules several flights daily to Madrid and Barcelona. There are railway (1861) links with Madrid, Zaragoza and northern Spain, operated by Renfe. High speed train link with Zaragoza, Madrid, and Barcelona was not expected until 2014. A new railway station will be built in the southern part of the city.

Within the city and surroundings there are also 23 daytime lines and 10 night lines of public buses, operated by TCC, the chartered company of the Mancomunidad de la Comarca de Pamplona.

== Main sights ==
Several notable churches, most of its 16th- to 18th-century fortified system and other civil architecture buildings belong to the historic-artistic heritage of Pamplona.

=== Religious architecture ===
The most important religious building is the fourteenth century Gothic Cathedral, with an outstanding cloister and a Neoclassical façade. There are another two main Gothic churches in the old city: Saint Sernin and Saint Nicholas, both built during the thirteenth century. Two other Gothic churches were built during the sixteenth century: Saint Dominic and Saint Augustine. During the seventeenth and eighteenth century were built the Baroque chapels of Saint Fermin, in the church of Saint Lawrence, and of the Virgin of the Road (Virgen del Camino), in the church of Saint Sernin, the convents of the Augustinian Recollect nuns and the Carmelite friars, and the Saint Ignatius basilica in the place where he was injured in the battle and during the subsequent convalescence he decided to be a priest. The most remarkable twentieth century religious buildings are probably the new diocesan seminary (1931) and the classical-revival style memorial church (1942) to the Navarrese dead in the Nationalist side of the Civil War and that is used today as temporary exhibitions room.

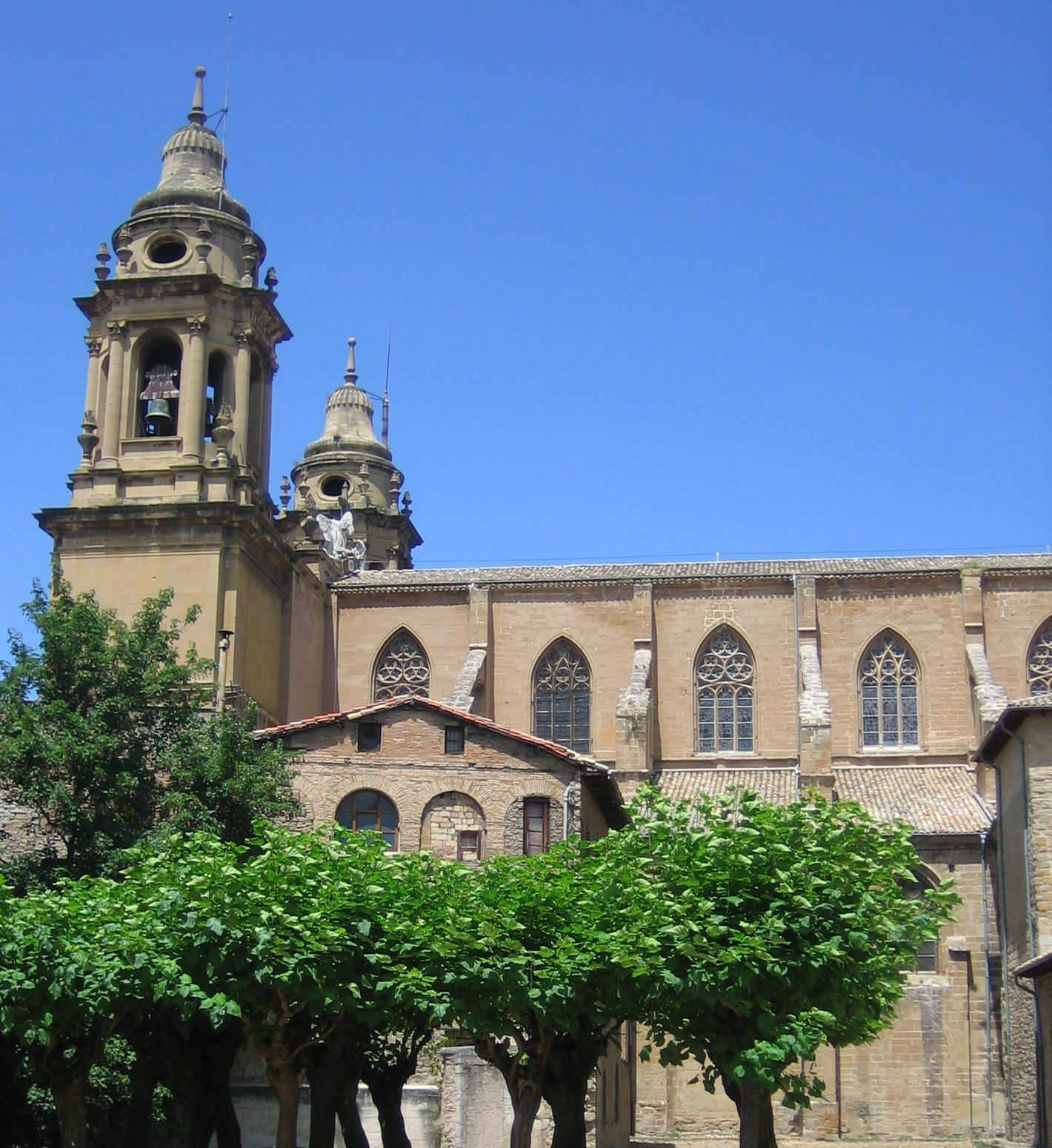
Pamplona Cathedral

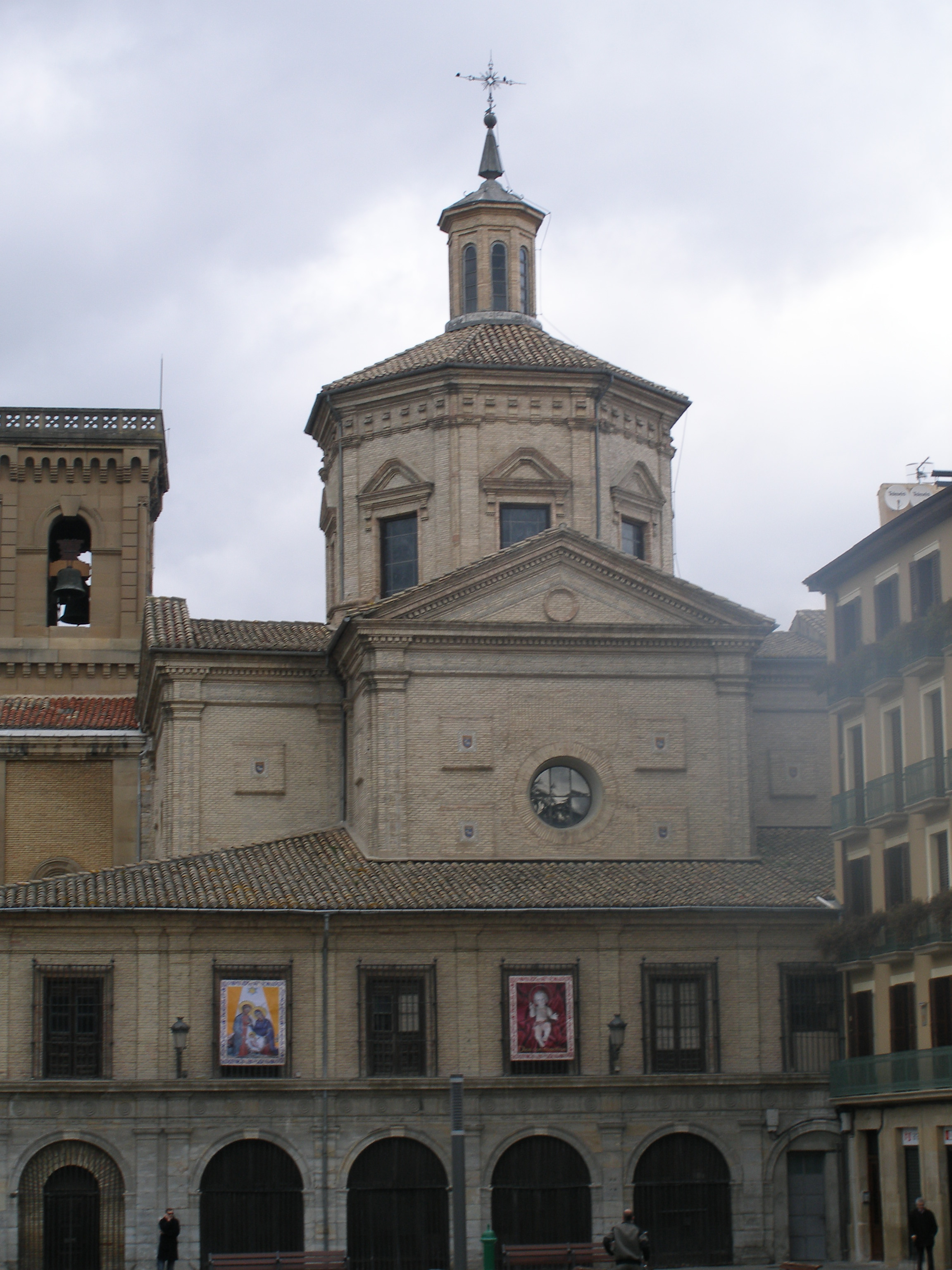
San Lorenzo Church

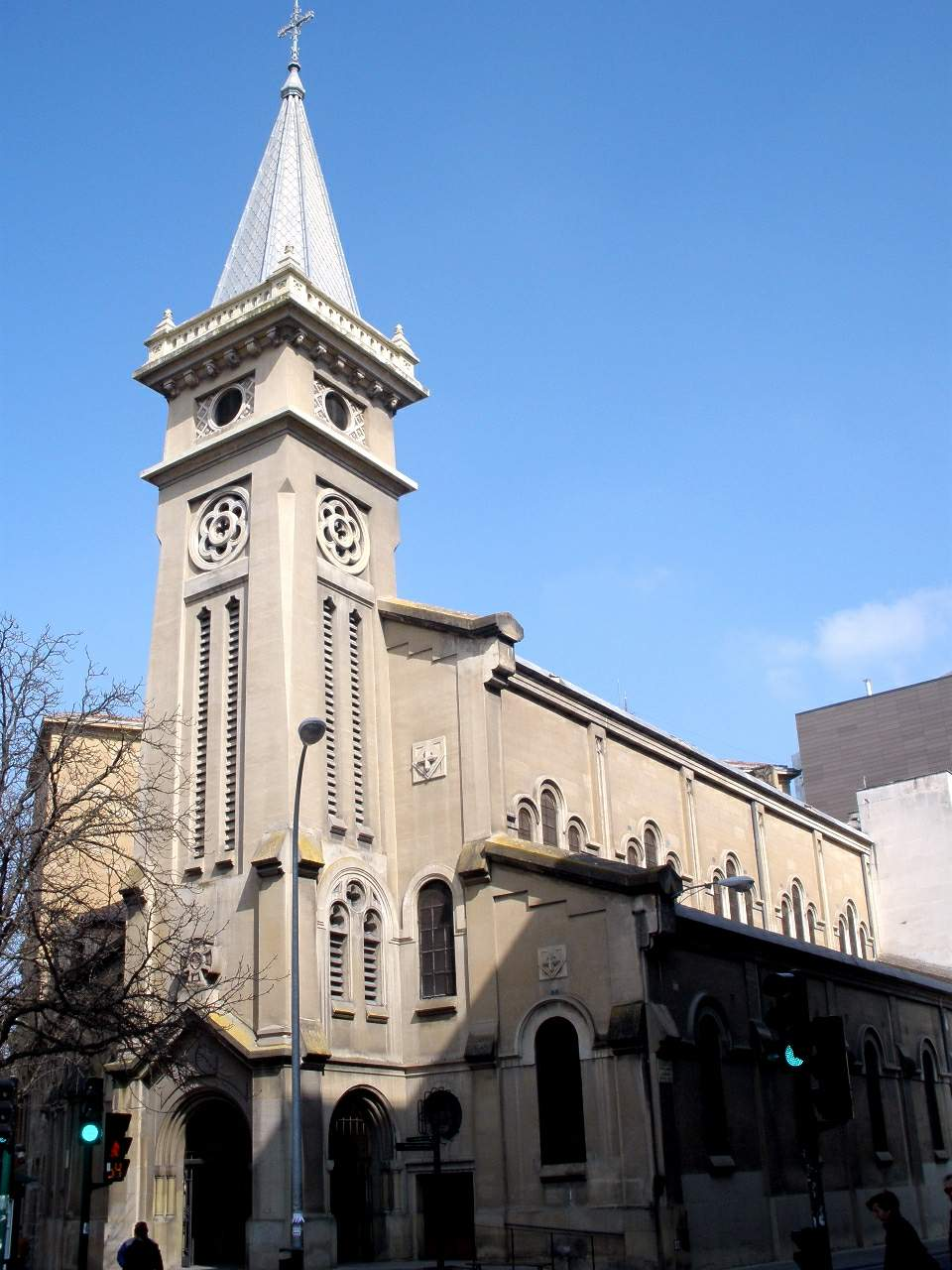
San Ignacio Church

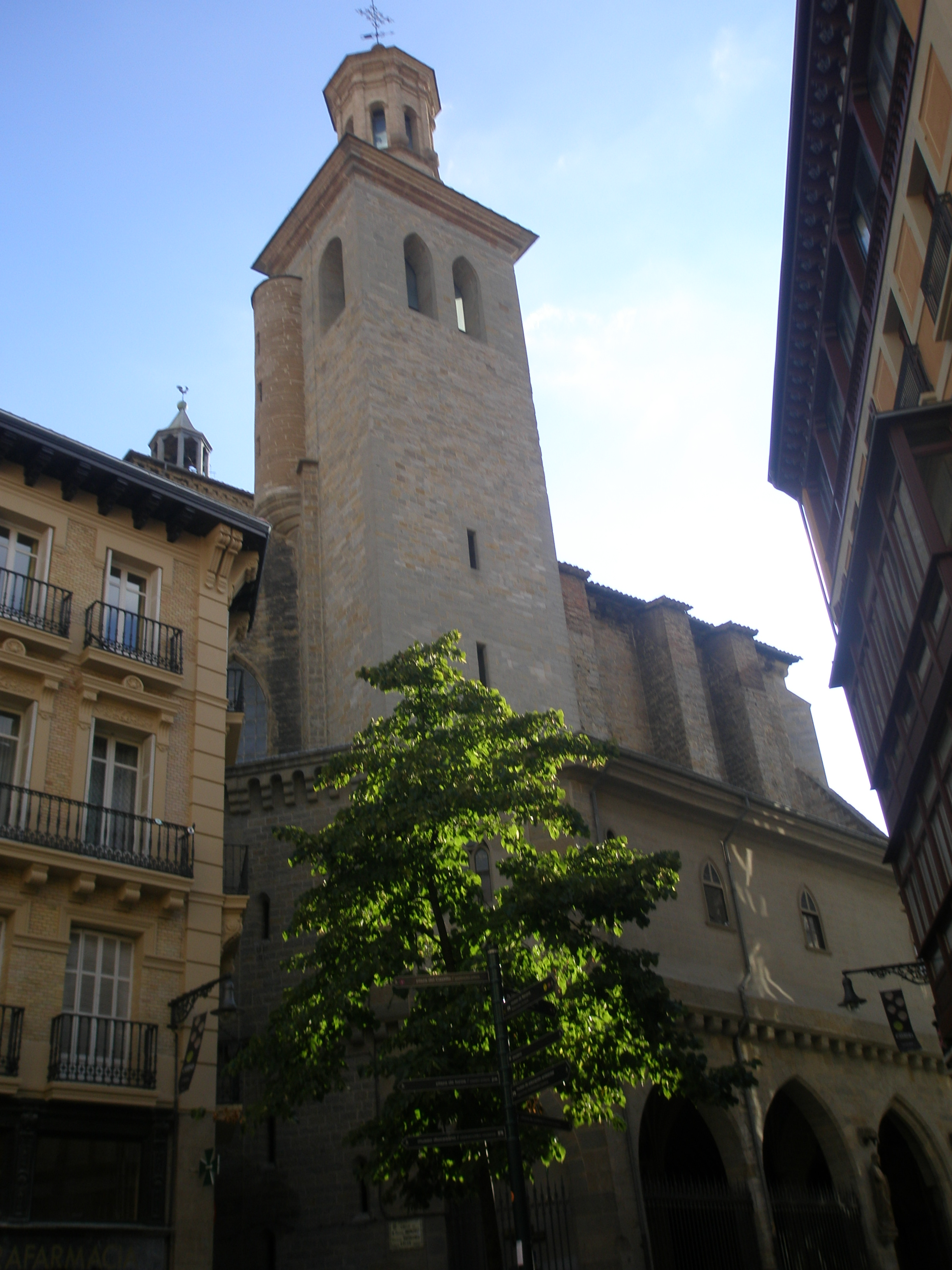
San Saturnino Church

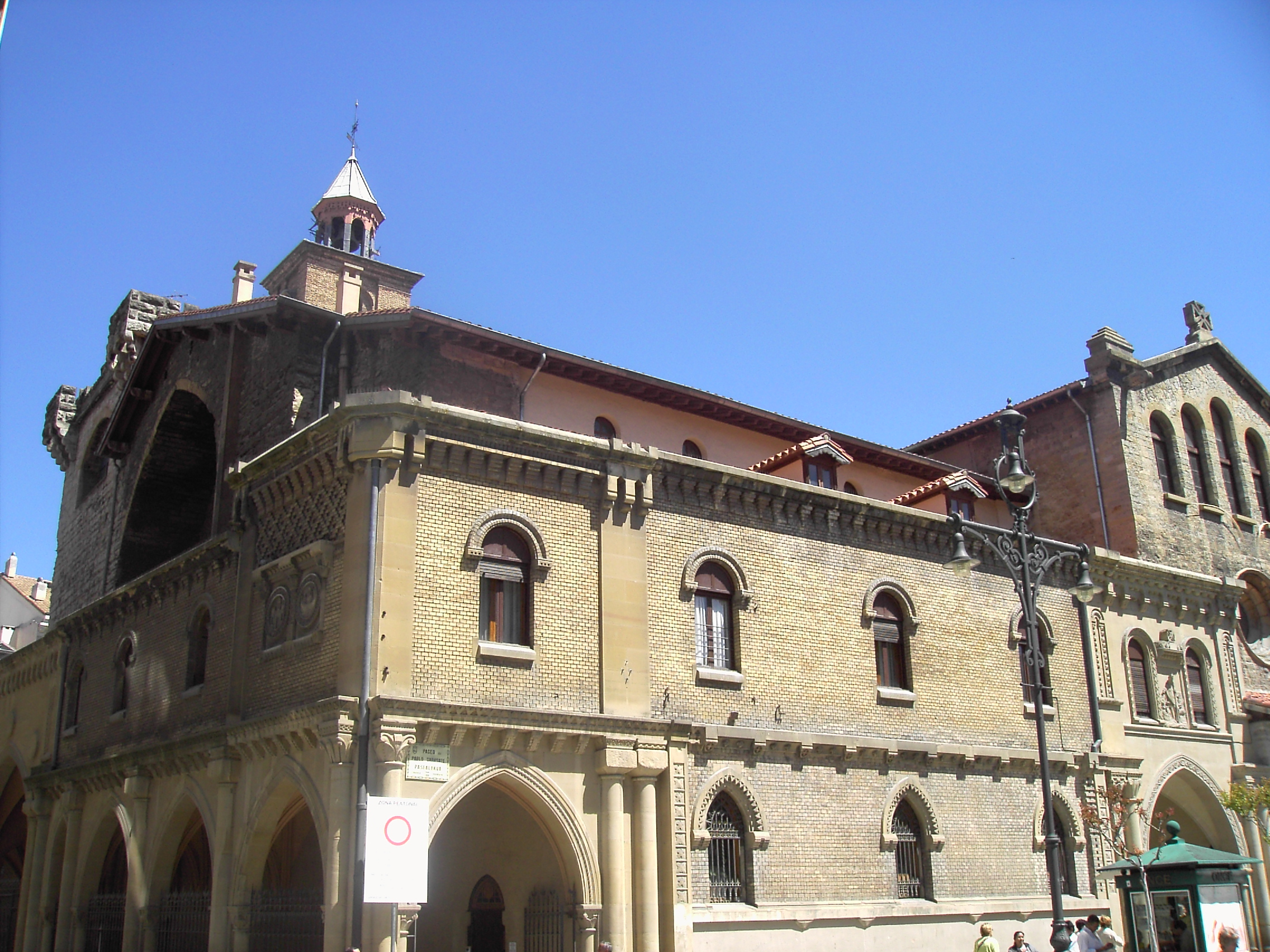
San Nicolás Church

=== Military and civil architecture ===
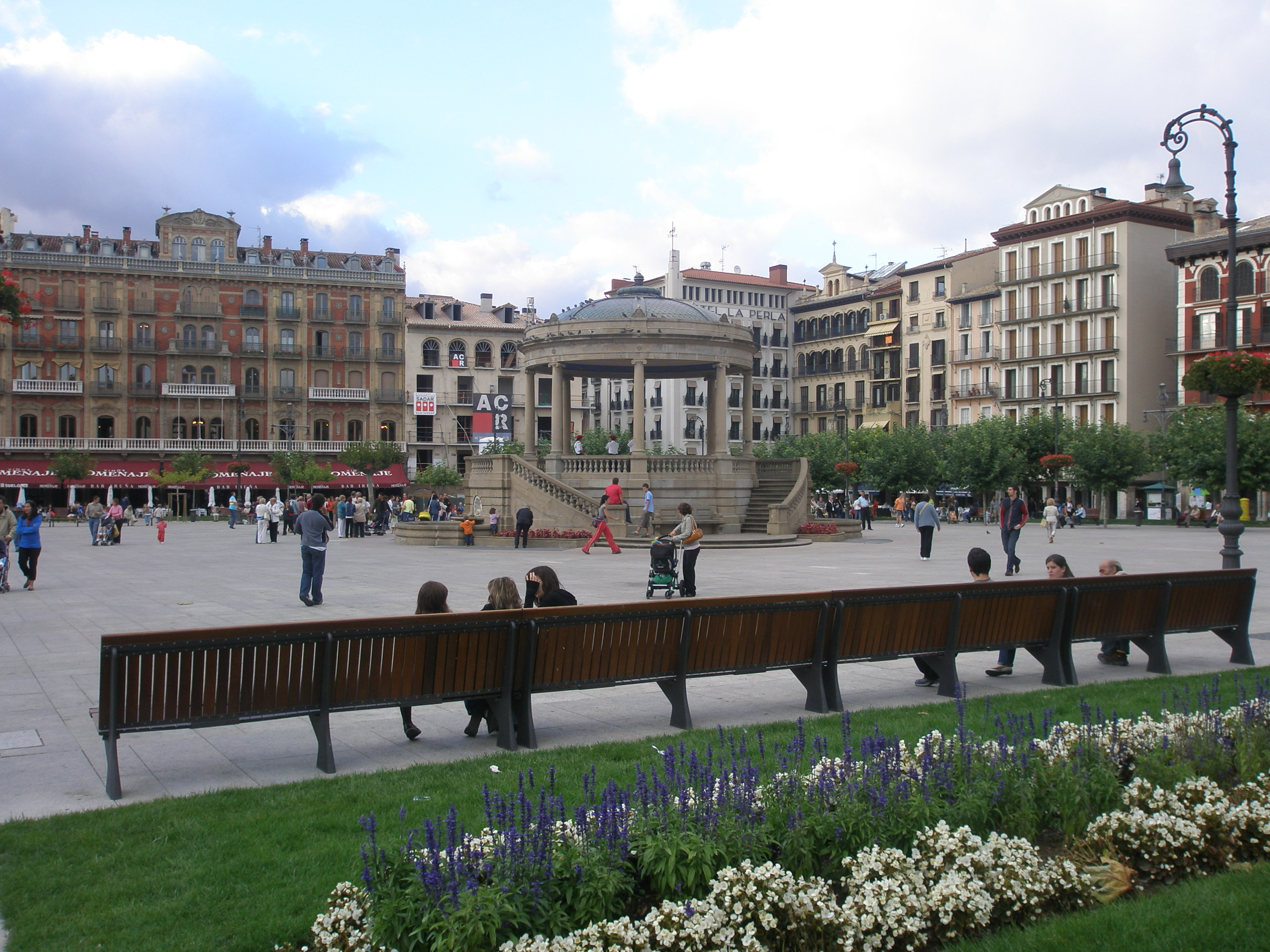
Plaza del Castillo

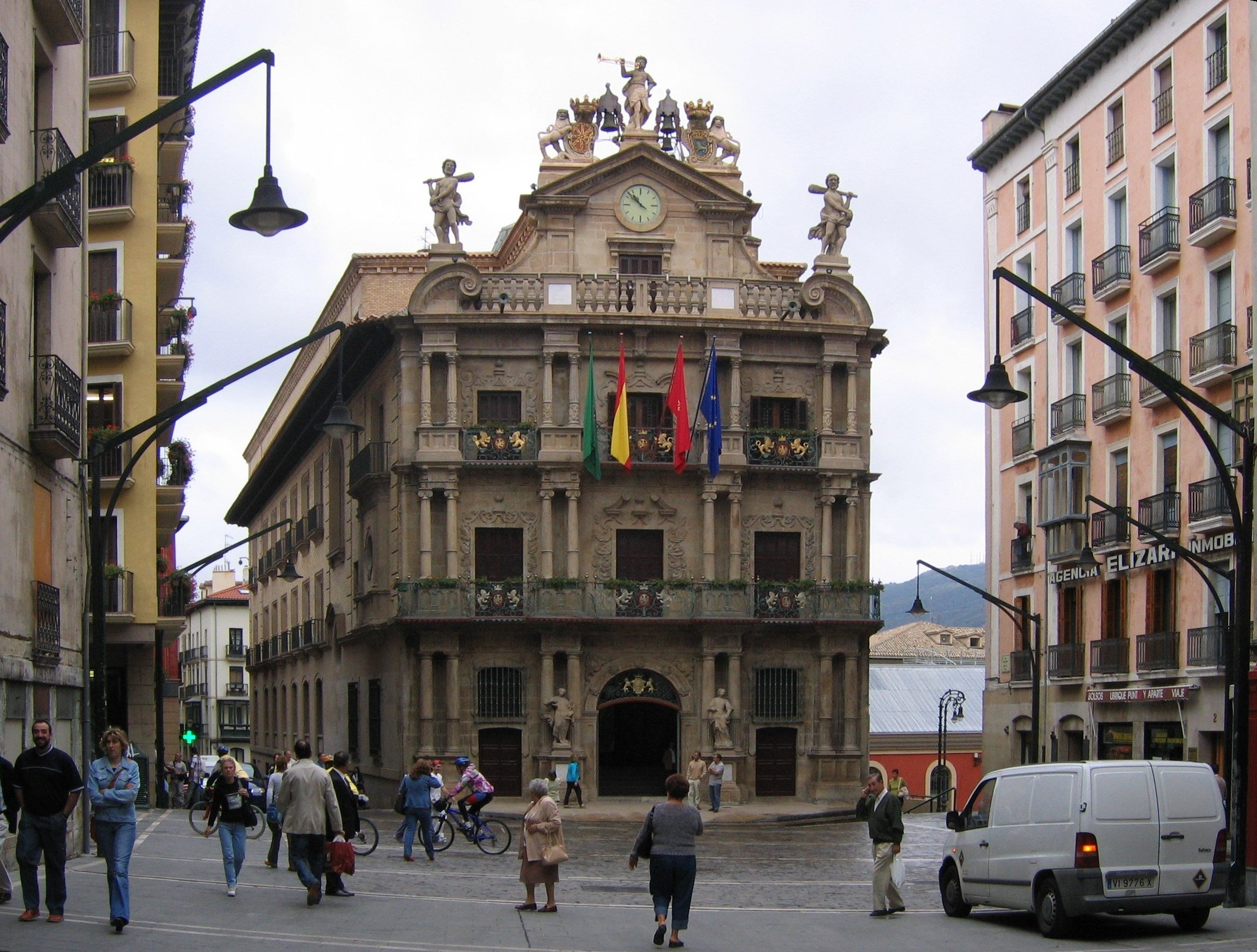
Pamplona town hall façade

From the prominent military past of Pamplona remain three of the four sides of the city walls and, with little modifications, the citadel or star fort. All the mediaeval structures were replaced and improved during 16th, 17th and 18th centuries in order to resist artillery sieges. Completely obsolete for modern warfare, they are used today as parks.

The oldest civil building today existing is a fourteenth-century house that was used as Cámara de Comptos (the court of auditors of the early modern autonomous kingdom of Navarre) from the sixteenth to the nineteenth century. There are also several medieval bridges on the Arga: Santa Engracia, Miluce, Magdalena, and San Pedro. The medieval palace of Saint Peter, which was alternatively used by Navarrese kings and Pamplonese bishops, was used during the early modern age as the Viceroy's palace and later was the seat of the military governor of Navarre; from the time of the Civil War it was in ruins but was recently rebuilt to be used as the General Archive of Navarre.

The most outstanding Baroque civil architecture is from the eighteenth century: town hall, episcopal palace, Saint John the Baptist seminary, and the Rozalejo's, Ezpeleta's (today music school), Navarro-Tafalla's (today, the local office of PNV), and Guenduláin's (today, a hotel) mansions. The provincial government built its own Neoclassical palace, the so-called Palace of Navarre, during the nineteenth century.

Late nineteenth and early twentieth century Pamplonese architecture shows the tendencies that are fully developed in other more important Spanish cities: La Agrícola building (1912), several apartment buildings with some timid modernist ornamentation, etc. The most notable architect in twentieth century Pamplona was Víctor Eusa (1894–1990), whose designs were influenced by the European expressionism and other avant-garde movements.

=== Parks ===
Pamplona has many parks and green areas. The oldest is the Taconera park, whose early designs are from the seventeenth century. Taconera is today a romantic park, with wide pedestrian paths, parterres, and sculptures.

The Media Luna park was built as part of the II Ensanche and is intended to allow relaxing strolling and sightseeing over the northern part of the town.

After its demilitarization, the citadel (Ciudadela) and its surrounding area (Vuelta del Castillo) shifted into a park area with large lawns and modern sculptures.

The most remarkable parks of the new neighborhoods include the Yamaguchi park, between Iturrama and Ermitagaña, which includes a little Japanese garden as well as the Planetarium of Pamplona; the campus of the University of Navarre; the Parque del Mundo in Chantrea; and the Arga park.

== Sports ==
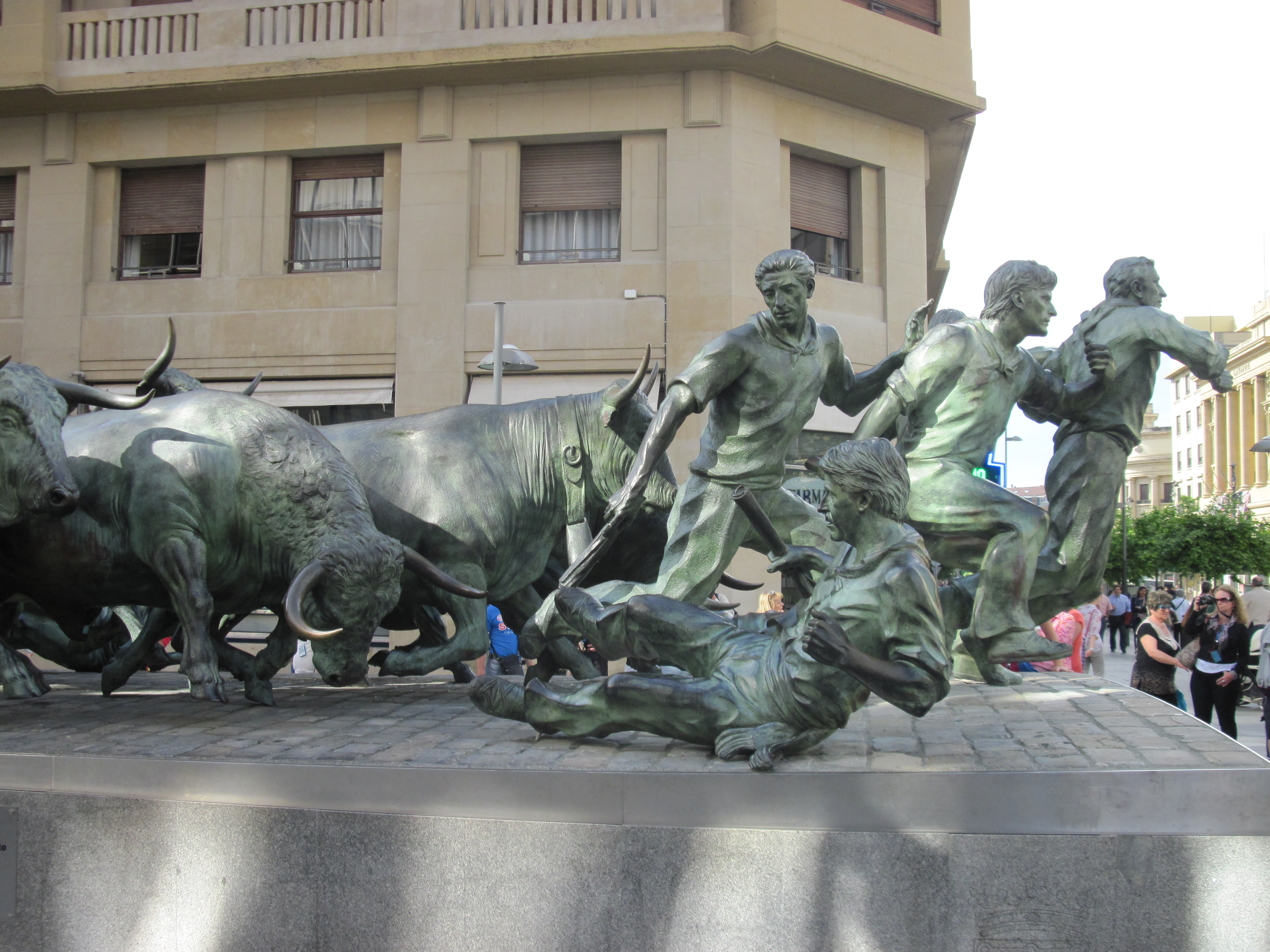
Monument to running of the bulls

Pamplona's bull ring, the Plaza de Toros de Pamplona, was rebuilt in 1923. It seats 19,529 and is the third largest in the world, after the bull rings of Mexico City and Madrid.

There are two football teams in Pamplona. CA Osasuna (Club Atlético Osasuna (Basque for "Health")) who play professionally in La Liga, and CD Pamplona who play in Tercera Federación. Osasuna play their home games at El Sadar Stadium.

SDC San Antonio was one of the most prominent Spanish handball teams in the 1990's and 2000's, winning both the Champions League and Spanish Championship, but they went bankrupt in 2012.

Other notable sports teams in Pamplona include MRA Xota (futsal), water polo and fencing (Campo de Deportes Larraina).

The Movistar Team, the direct descendant of Indurain's Banesto team, is based in Egüés, a municipality in the metropolitan area of Pamplona.

Pamplona is also home to the headquarters of the International Federation of Basque Pelota (FIPV). Basque pelota is principally practiced in France, Spain, and North and South America, but also in other countries like Italy and Philippines.

=== Notable Athletes ===
Five-time Tour de France winner Miguel Indurain was born in an outlying area of Pamplona and continues to reside in the city.

Former Arsenal goalkeeper Manuel Almunia was born in Pamplona and started his career at CA Osasuna.

== Notable people ==
- Fermin (* 272; † 303)
- Martín de Rada, (1533–1578)
- Pablo de Sarasate (1844–1908), internationally renowned composer and violin player
- José Sanjurjo (1872–1936), army general
- Joaquín Beunza Redín (1872-1936), Carlist politician
- Víctor Pradera Larumbe (1873–1936), Carlist politician
- Ignacio Baleztena Ascárate (1887–1972), Carlist politician
- Francisco López Sanz (1896-1977), longtime manager of El Pensamiento Navarro
- Luis Arellano Dihinx (1906–1969), Carlist politician
- Sabicas (1912–1990)
- Jaime del Burgo Torres (1912–2005), Carlist politician
- Alfredo Landa (1933–2013)
- Marysa Navarro (1934–2025), historian
- Carlos Garaikoetxea (born 1938)
- Javier Rojo (born 1949)
- Serafín Zubiri (born 1964), singer
- Jon Andoni Goikoetxea (born 1965), Spain footballer
- Alberto Urroz (born 1965), classical pianist
- Cesar Palacios Chocarro (born 1974), Spain footballer
- Javier López Vallejo (born 1975), Spain footballer
- Francisco Puñal (born 1975), Spain footballer
- Tiko (born 1976), Spain footballer
- Manuel Almunia (born 1977), Spain footballer
- Jesús María Lacruz (born 1978), Spain footballer
- Gorka Iraizoz (born 1981), Spain footballer
- Miguel Flaño (born 1984), Spain footballer
- Javier Flaño (born 1984), Spain footballer
- Fernando Llorente (born 1985), Spain footballer
- María Hernández (born 1986), Spanish professional golfer
- Raúl García (born 1986), Spain footballer
- Nacho Monreal (born 1986), Spain footballer
- Abel Azcona (born 1988), Contemporary artist
- César Azpilicueta (born 1989), Spain footballer
- Carlota Ciganda (born 1990), Spanish professional golfer
- Iker Muniain (born 1992), Spain footballer
- Mikel Merino (born 1996), Spain footballer
- Amaia Romero (born 1999), singer
- Nico Williams (Born 2002), Spain footballer
- Oihan Sancet (Born 2000), Spain footballer
- Natalia Lacunza (born 1999), Spanish pop artist

== Twin towns and sister cities ==
Pamplona is twinned with the following cities:

- Yamaguchi, Japan, since 1980
- Bayonne, France, since 1960
- Paderborn, Germany, since 1992
- Pamplona, Colombia, since 2001
