= San Nicolás (Pamplona borough) =

San Nicolás (Saint Nicolas in English) is one of the three boroughs that merged in 1423 to form the modern city of Pamplona (Iruña in Basque). The others were Navarrería (the original Navarrese town) and San Cernin.

== Situation ==
San Nicolás limits to the north with the Navarrería borough, to the south with Paseo Sarasate (Sarasate Boulevard), on the east bounds on Plaza del Castillo (Castle Square) and to the west with the Parque de la Taconera (Taconera Park).

== History ==
San Nicolás was founded in the 12th century by a group of weavers and turners. The new borough was initially called Tencerías (from the old Romance word Tencero, Weaver). In 1366, when the first census of the city was completed, there were 29 families living there. However, population grew quickly and in 1427 there were 64 families living there.

In 1423, some namesake streets existed, but in different boroughs. There were two or three High Streets, Carpenters' Street, Butchers' Street, Shoemakers' Street and some more. The reason for that lies in the fact that streets were named after the shops and businesses operating in them. San Nicolás was home to the oldest streets, since Navarrería had been totally destroyed during the War of the Boroughs (1276), and San Cernin did not go unscathed either, with many buildings, streets and churches ruined. Therefore, the king Charles III of Navarre decided to change the names of the streets in Navarrería and San Cernin.

Pablo de Sarasate, a famous violinist, was born in San Nicolás Street, where a tributary plaque in his honour can be found.

== List of streets in San Nicolás borough ==
- Calle Nueva (New Street)
- Plaza del Consejo (Counsel Square)
- Calle Zapatería (Shoemakers' street)
- Calle Pozoblanco (White Pit Street)
- Plaza Comedias (Comedies street)
- Plaza de San Nícolás (Saint Nicolas Square)
- Rincón de San Nicolás (Saint Nicolas Little Square)
- Calle de San Nicolás (Saint Nicolas Street)
- Calle de Indatxikia (Indatxikia Street)
- Calle San Miguel (Saint Micael Street)
- Calle San Antón (Saint Anthon Street)
