= Alberto Urroz =

Alberto Urroz (born 22 June 1970 in Pamplona) is a Spanish classical pianist, who began his musical education at home. He studied piano with Joaquín Soriano at the Madrid Royal Conservatory. Later, he moved to Israel to study with Pnina Salzman at the Tel Aviv University, and subsequently, on a Navarre state scholarship, with Oxana Yablonskaya in New York City. Other teachers include Solomon Mikowsky and Donn-Alexander Feder at Manhattan School of Music in New York, and masterclasses with György Sándor (Zumaia), Fanny Waterman (Valencia), Ena Bronstein Barton (Princeton) and Ana María Trenchi (NYC). He performs as a soloist throughout Europe, Asia and the USA in such venues as Carnegie Hall in New York, Sejong Center in Seoul and the Festival Internacional de Santander and Peralada in Spain. Urroz is piano professor at the Alfonso X el Sabio University, Musical Arts Madrid and Arturo Soria Conservatory in Madrid, is founder and since 2004 artistic director and founder of the Mendigorría International Music Festival in Spain, is president of the European Piano Teachers Association EPTA Spain since 2018, and is the cofounder and artistic director of the Madrid Shigeru Kawai Piano Competition (2019). Urroz has recorded works by D. Scarlatti, M. Sánchez Allú, I. Albéniz, Granados, de Falla and Mompou for Ibs Classical.
