= Folklore of Belgium =

The Folklore of Belgium is extremely diverse and reflects the rich legacy of cultural and religious influences which have acted on the region throughout its history, even before the establishment of the nation of Belgium in 1830. Much of Belgian folklore is unique to the region in which it is commemorated. Many aspects of folklore are manifested in public processions and parades in Belgian cities; traditions which are kept alive for the amusement of locals and tourists alike.

The term folklore (which is rendered identically in both French and Dutch) is used in Belgium in a much wider sense than in English, chiefly to denote all cultural events open to the public such as traditional festivals and parades. Excluded from folklore are individual (not public) traditions, like the celebration of Easter, food (except if linked to a public cultural event), and events that saw their start only recently, including music festivals such as I Love Techno.

== Brussels ==
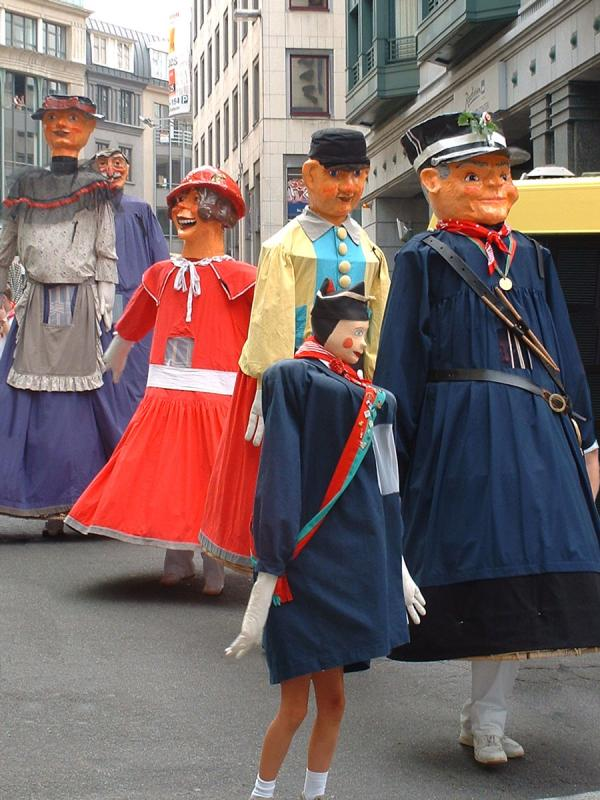
Meyboom giants in Brussels, a UNESCO Intangible Cultural Heritage

Brussels' identity owes much to its rich folklore and traditions, among the liveliest in the country.

The Ommegang, a medieval pageant and folkloric costumed procession, commemorating the Joyous Entry of Emperor Charles V and his son, Philip II, in Brussels in 1549, takes place every year in July. The colourful parade includes floats, traditional processional giants, such as Saint Michael and Saint Gudula, and scores of folkloric groups, either on foot or on horseback, dressed in medieval garb. The parade concludes with a large spectacle at the Grand-Place/Grote Markt (Brussels' main square). Since 2019, it has been recognised as a Masterpiece of the Oral and Intangible Heritage of Humanity by UNESCO.

The Meyboom, an even-older folk tradition of Brussels (1308), celebrating the "May tree"—in fact, a corruption of the Dutch word, meaning tree of joy—takes place paradoxically on 9 August. After parading a young beech in the city, it is planted in a joyful spirit with lots of music, Brusseleir songs, and processional giants. It has also been recognised as an expression of intangible cultural heritage by UNESCO, as part of the bi-national inscription "Processional giants and dragons in Belgium and France". The celebration is reminiscent of the town's long-standing (folkloric) feud with Leuven, which dates back to the Middle Ages.

Saint Verhaegen (often shortened to St V), a folkloric student procession, celebrating the anniversary of the founding of the Université libre de Bruxelles (ULB) and the Vrije Universiteit Brussel (VUB), is held on 20 November. Since 2019, it has also been listed as intangible cultural heritage of the Brussels-Capital Region.

Another introduction to the Brusseleir local dialect and way of life can be obtained at the Royal Theatre Toone, a folkloric theatre of marionettes, located a stone's throw away from the Grand-Place. Finally, two folkloric plays, Le Mariage de mademoiselle Beulemans by Frantz Fonson and Fernand Wicheler, and Bossemans et Coppenolle by Joris d'Hanswyck and Paul Van Stalle, are still the subject of regular revivals.

== Province of East Flanders ==
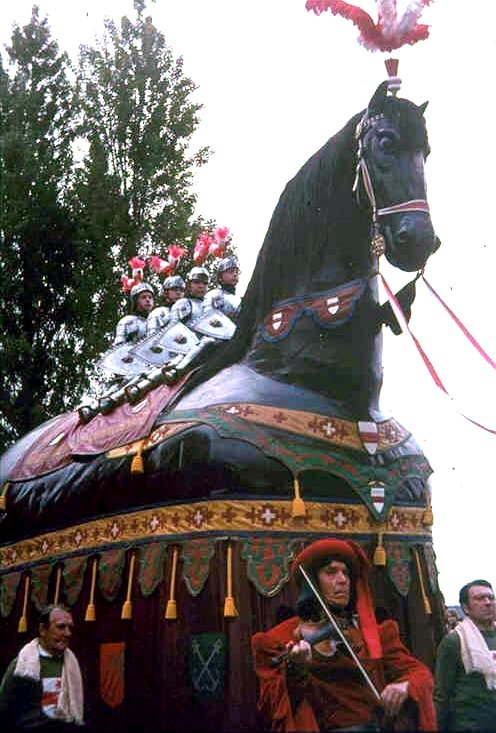
Ros Beiaard in Dendermonde, a UNESCO Intangible Cultural Heritage

The Ros Beiaard is a large folkloristic horse. It differs from the other Ros-Beiaard horses because it is used only once every ten years and because the horse is carried by people. The Ros Beiaard is on UNESCO's list of Masterpieces of the Oral and Intangible Heritage of Humanity, under the "Processional giants and dragons in Belgium and France".

== Province of West Flanders ==
In Bruges, the Procession of the Holy Blood (Heilig Bloedprocessie) is held on Ascension Day each year, during which a relic—a rock-crystal vial allegedly found in 1148 during the Second Crusade by Derick of Alsace (the Count of Flanders) which is believed to contain the blood of Christ—is paraded round the city. The procession itself is said to date to the 13th century. Each year, the procession attracts some 50,000 visitors and pilgrims.

In the town of Veurne, the so-called Boeteprocessie (Procession of Penitents) takes place on the last Sunday of July. Various events take place which reenact the Passion of Jesus, including cross-carrying and a procession of hooded penitents.

The Kattenstoet (Cat Festival) takes place in Ypres every three years, possibly commemorating a medieval tradition in which cats, then associated with witchcraft, were thrown from the tower of the city's Cloth Hall.

== Province of Antwerp ==
In the so-called 'polderdorpen', Ekeren, Hoevenen, Stabroek, Berendrecht, Zandvliet en Lillo, north of the city of Antwerp, a traditional game called Ganzenrijden (goose-riding) is kept alive. A (dead) goose is hung in a fishing net high above the ground, and the objective is to pull of its head while riding a horse underneath it. The winner is then crowned king for a year. Then, the kings of every village gather in a second competition to see who is the best among them, and the winner of that competition is subsequently crowned the emperor.

== Province of Hainaut ==
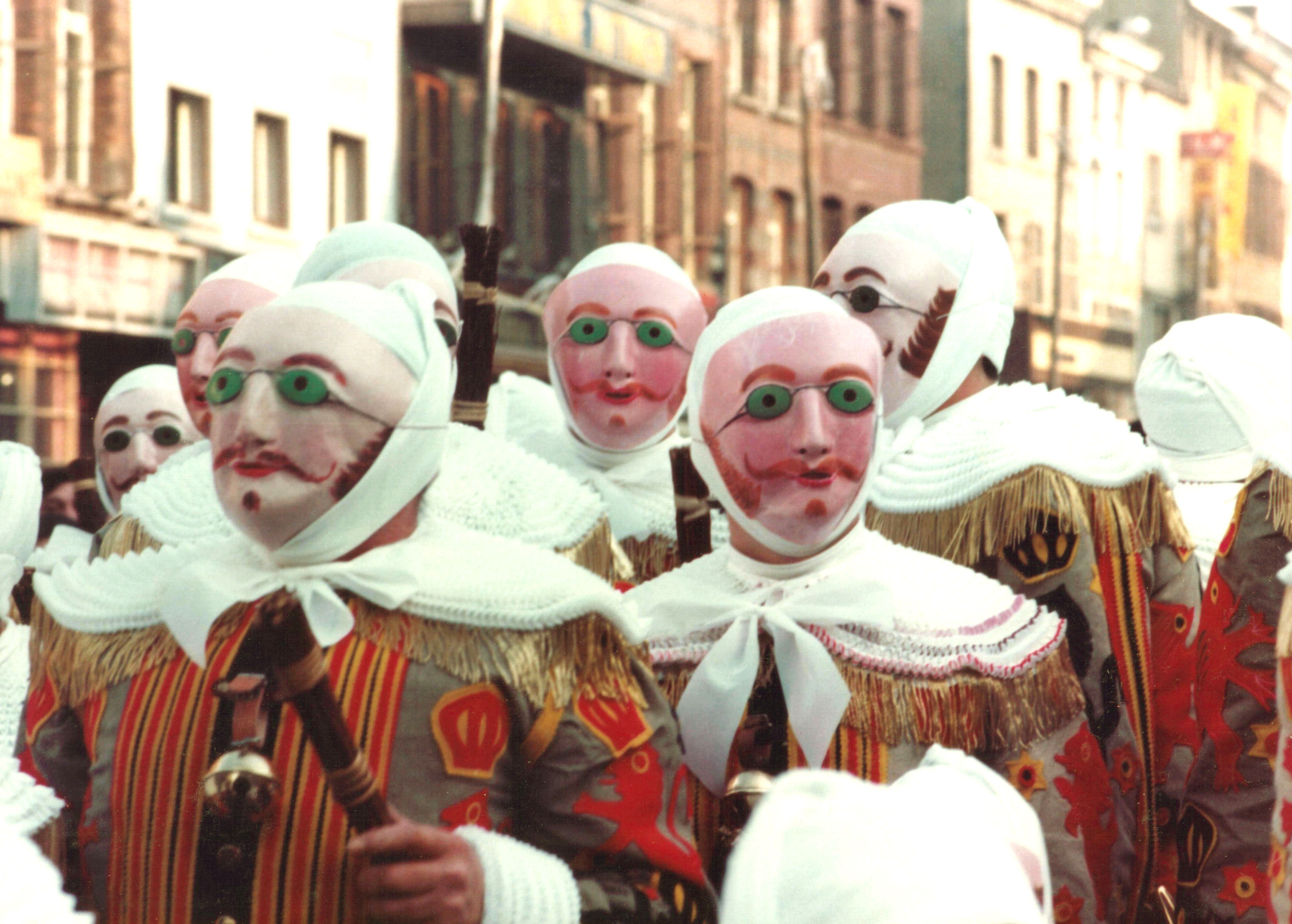
The Gilles at the Carnival of Binche

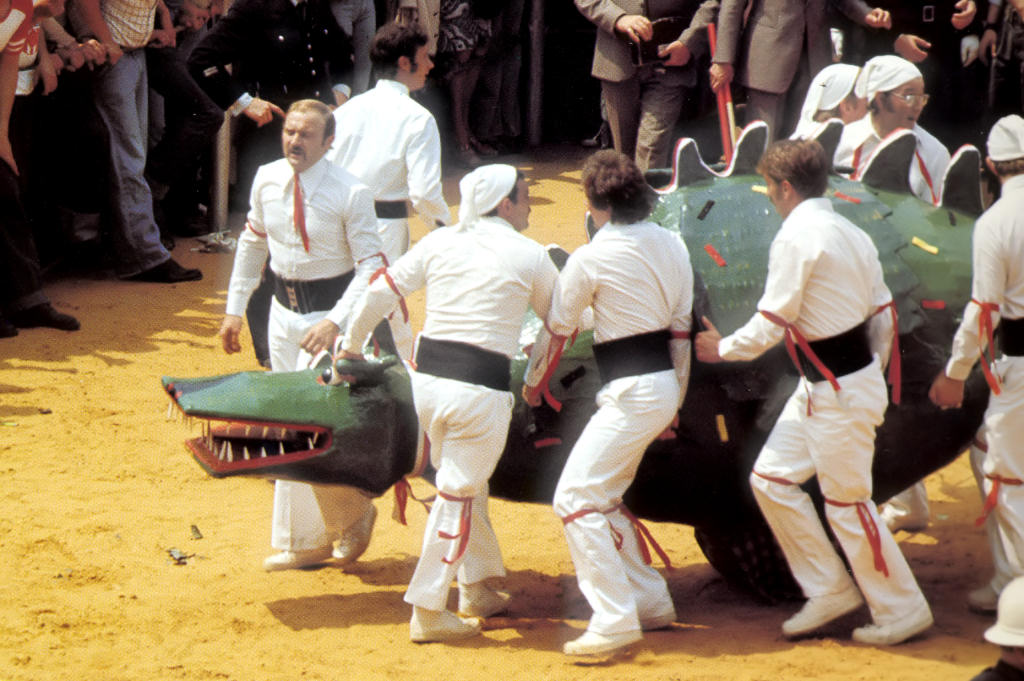
Ducasse de Mons, a UNESCO Intangible Cultural Heritage

The three-day Carnival of Binche, near Mons, is one of the best known in Belgium. It takes place around Shrove Tuesday (or Mardi Gras) just before Lent (the 40 days between Ash Wednesday and Easter). Performers known as Gilles wear elaborate costumes in the national colours of red, black and yellow. During the parade, they throw oranges at the crowd. In 2003, it was recognized by UNESCO as one of the Masterpieces of the Oral and Intangible Heritage of Humanity.

Each summer, the town of Ath holds a procession known as the Ducasse (or Parade of Giants). The procession, which traces its origins to the Middle Ages, commemorates the marriage of two giants (Mr and Mrs Gouyasse or Goliath). A mock ceremony is held in a church, and afterward, the giant fights a shepherd David, in front of the Town Hall. Onlookers throw coins at the effigies of the giants as they pass for good luck. It is clear that the Christian story of David and Goliath was influential to this festival.

== Province of Namur ==
The town of Andenne holds a festival each year three weeks before Easter known as the "Bear Festival". The story told about the festival is that it commemorates young Charles Martel's defeat of a bear which was terrorizing the region. The bear also features on the town's coat of arms. Sainte-Begge, allegedly related to Martel, is credited with founding the city in 684. 2,000 people participate in the parade, in costume, and 250 teddy bears are thrown to the public from the Town Hall.

In the furrow between the Sambre and the Meuse, one finds century-old traditions, religious processions influenced by the passage of the French army, known as the Marches of Entre-Sambre-et-Meuse. They are usually composed of almost 300 soldiers and many more people who come to see them. During three days, the "marcheurs" honor the saint of the local parish.

== Province of Liège ==
The town of Stavelot holds the Blanc Moussis (meaning 'clad in white') festival. Participants wear white sheets and hoods, and masks with pointed noses. The festival recalls the monks of the 15th century who were forbidden from celebrating carnival because of their laziness. Participants wander the streets of the town putting up posters. In the afternoon they shower the crowds with confetti while hitting them with pork bladders.

== Province of Luxembourg ==
The folklore of the Ardennes, in the province of Luxembourg, is particularly rich.
