= Ros Beiaard =

Ros Beiaard may refer to:

- Bayard (legend), a magical horse known as (Ros) Beiaard in Dutch
- Ros Beiaard Dendermonde, a festival related to the horse Bayard
