= Gayant =

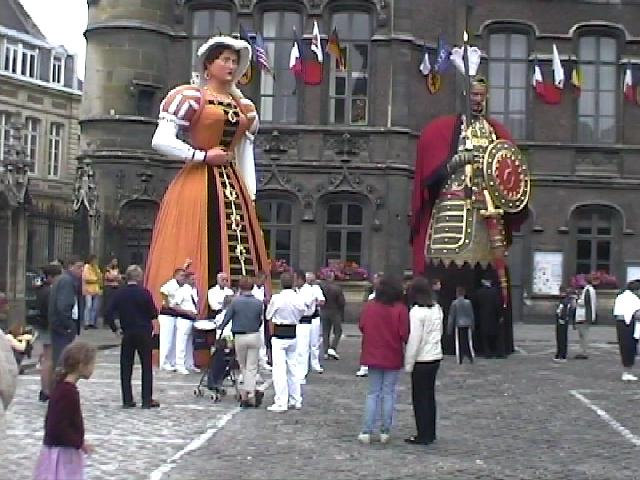
Carriers below the giant couple in front of the town hall

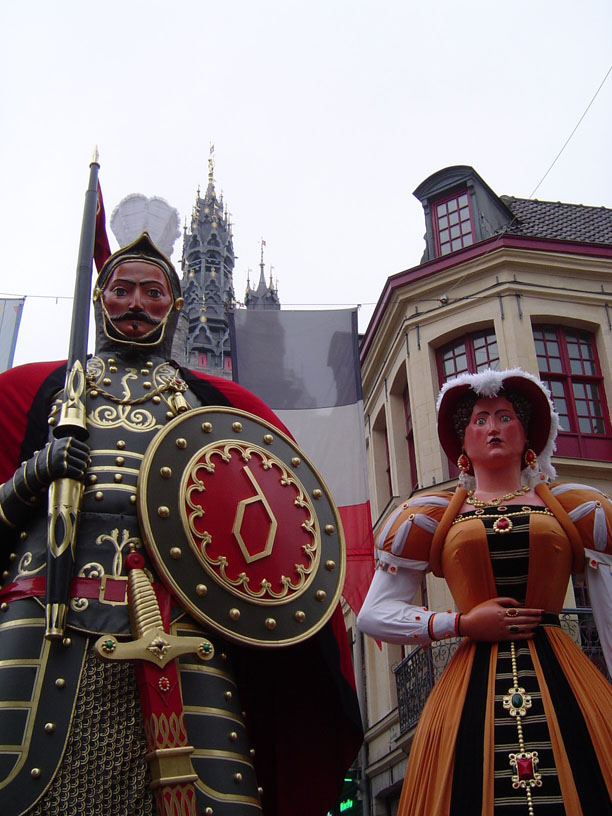
Gayant and Marie Cagenon

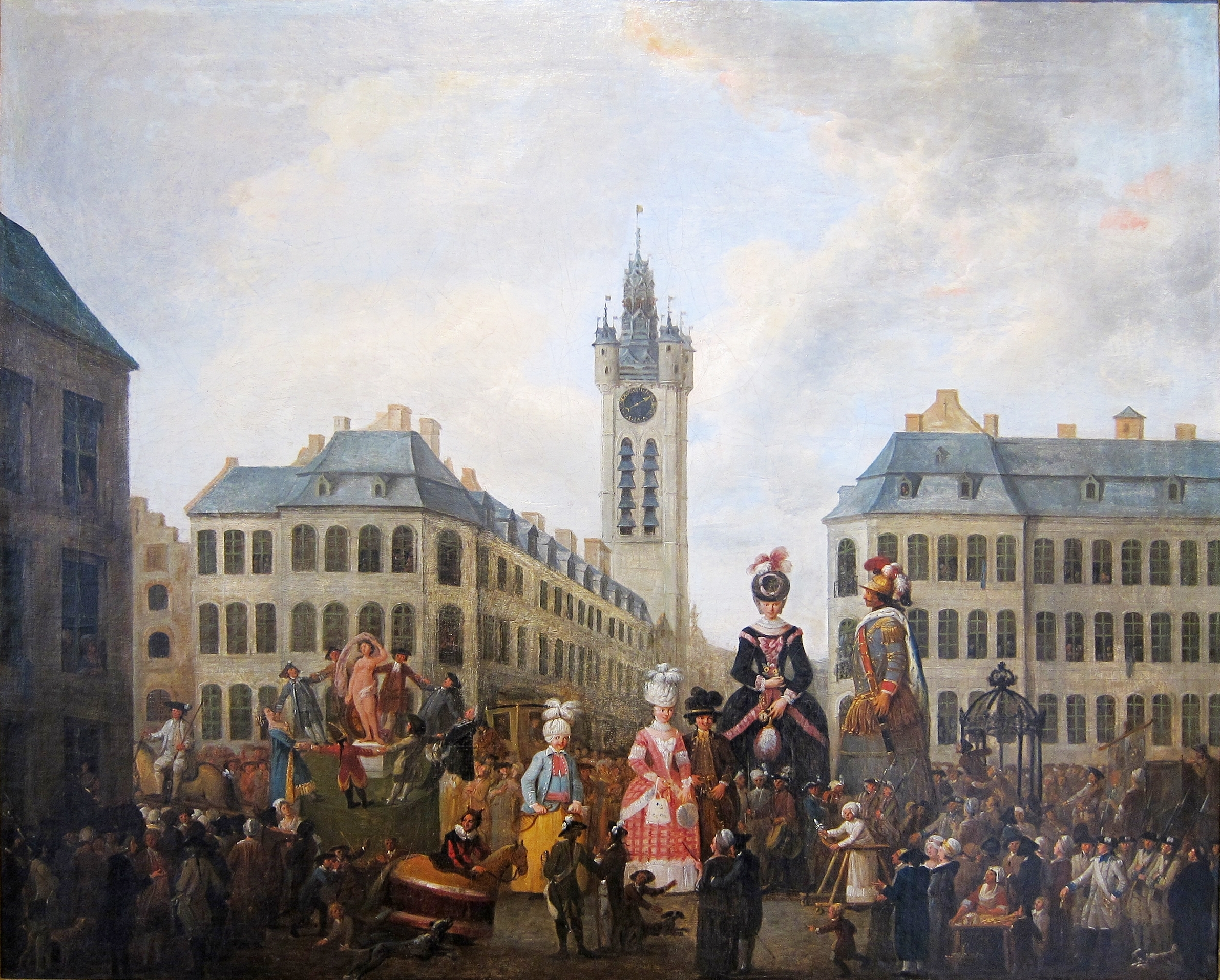
Family of Gayant of Douai (1780) by Louis Joseph Watteau in Musée de la Chartreuse de Douai.

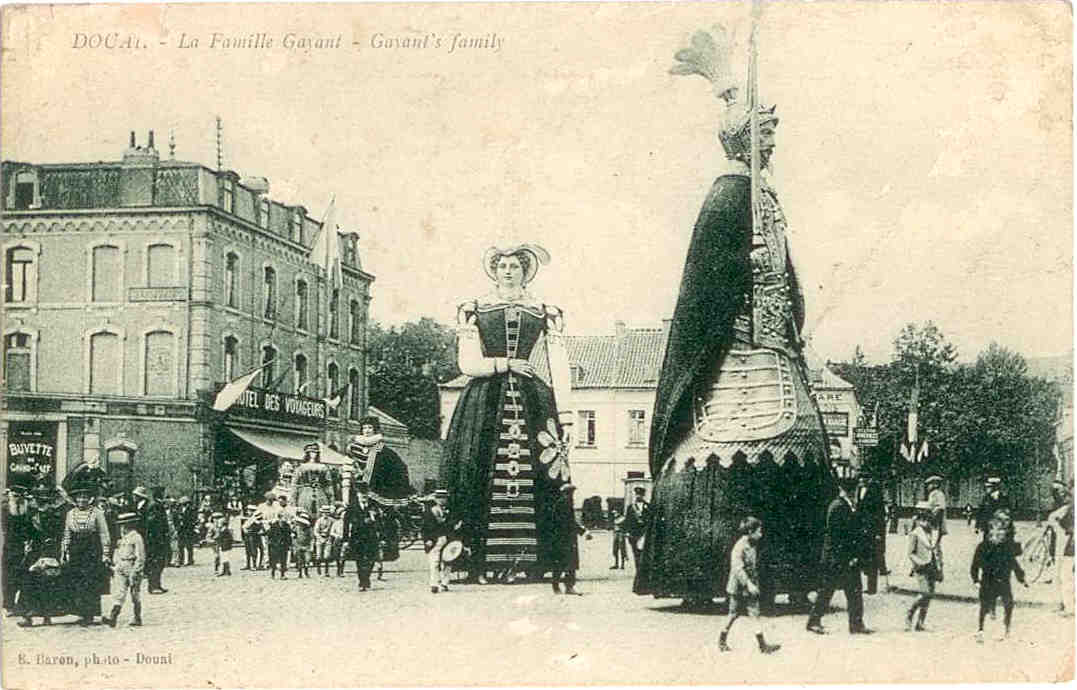
Gayants in 1910.

Gayant is a processional giant that symbolizes the city of Douai. It is carried through the city for three days each year at the beginning of July as part of an eponymous festival alongside its "wife", Marie Cagenon, and their three "children", Jacquot, Fillon, and Binbin. The family arrives at the belfry at Douai on the final Sunday of the festival, which culminates with Le Grand Cortège (The Grand Procession) in the afternoon.

Gayant is included in UNESCO's Intangible Cultural Heritage List as an example of processional giants and dragons in Belgium and France.

== Family ==
The Gayant family consists of Gayant, his wife Marie Cagenon, and their three children: Jacquot, Fillon, and Binbin.

Data	Gayant	Marie Cagenon	Jacquot	Fillon	Binbin
First appearance	1530	1531	1675	1687	1715
Current model first made	1954	1954	1947	1947	1947
Height (m)	8.51 m	6.26 m	3.40 m	3.15 m	2.42 m
Weight (Kg)	375 kg	250 kg	80 kg	70 kg	45 kg
Carrier(s)	6 Carriers	6 carriers	1 carrier	1 carrier	1 carrier

The giants have gone through multiple rebuilding sessions (NR), restorations (R), and disappearances (D):

Giant	NR	R	D
Gayant	1530, 1692, 1703, 1712, 1785, 1801, 1823	1700, 1716, 1719, 1723, 1724, 1724, 1741, 1809	1792
Marie-Cagenon	1531, 1714, 1801, 1823	1712, 1719,	1792
Jacqout	1675, 1801, 1827	1719, 1724, 1741, 1780, 1809	1792
Fillon	1678, 1801, 1827	1724, 1741, 1782, 1809	1792
Binbin	1715, 1801, 1827	1719, 1724, 1741, 1780, 1809	1792

Since 1827, plans to restore and rebuild the family have been coordinated, occurring in 1859, 1867, 1874, 1881, 1885, 1892, 1912, 1922, 1947, and 1954. Each year, the mannequins, which are constructed of wicker, are cleaned and restored.

Unlike other cities, Douai did not give a name to its giant; it is simply called Gayant (giant) in the language of Picardy, which was in use in Douai at the time of the original festival.

== History ==
=== Jehan Gelon ===
According to local legend, at the end of the ninth century, the townsmen of Scarpe asked for Jehan Gelon to help them if the city were attacked by barbarians. Gelon advised them to take refuge in the tower and to expect him in the event of an attack.

When the city was besieged by the Normans, Gelon, accompanied by his three sons, arrived by traveling through a tunnel in the city and defeated the Normans. The attackers who, while leaving, destroyed his castle and massacred the women there. Gelon and his sons, now traumatized from the loss of their families decide to go to war. According to legend, Gelon died close to Bavay. The legend has it that the inhabitants of Douai, in remembering his acts of bravery, made him a giant—the symbol of the city.

=== The Giant, Maloré and Morant ===
An episode of La Belle Hélène de Constantinople, a famous epic of the 14th century, takes place between Douai and Cantin. Morant and his army ineffectively besiege the tower of the Giant, the perfidious and heathen vassal situated in Douai. This tower is linked by an underground passage with Cantin, where the giant brother of Douai, Maloré, was. Morant decides to take the tower of Cantin, which was easier to break in. Morant rushes to Cantin to help his brother. But Morant takes bulwarks, kills the Giant, and releases Douai and Cantin from the heathen.

Jean Wauquelin (1452) wrote this epic for the Duke of Burgundy Philip the Good in 1448.

=== Saint Maurand ===
Many historians reject the legend of Jean Gelon and prefer to see it as the city's homage to Saint Maurand. Two stories exist about the appearance of Saint Maurand in a dream, preventing the French capture of a city.

The most commonly accepted example goes as follows: In 1479, the French invaded Douai, then Burgundian. On 16 June 1479, several French troops tried to open the Door of Arras; it was believed that St. Maurand prevented them from intruding. Several of his sacred artifacts were treasured within the church of Sacré-Coeur.

The second story says that the procession of the giant had already begun, so the identification with the Saint came later. In 1556, St. Maurand told the guard of Sacré-Coeur's church to "sound the matins." Subsequently, a knight of Light, Saint Maurand appeared to fight against Gaspard de Coligny.

=== Other stories ===
In the 19th century, several accounts in the form of tales or plays take a Gayant-like character and reinvent his history. "Intrepid Gayant", one of the "Tales of King Cambrinus" written by Charles Deulin is a well known tale: The giant of Douai becomes a wild child brought up by a she-bear, which takes it for one of her own because of his breadth and his bear-like strength. A logger finds him, adopts him, and the child becomes an adult.

=== Description ===
The giant has had his current form since 1954. The earliest description dates to 1530, and describes the character as twenty-two feet tall, wearing the costume of a feudal man of war in medieval armor with gloved hands. The mannequin was created by the corporation of the Manneliers. Until 1598, only one carrier was needed to move it. In 1665, it needed five carriers for the wicker mannequin. The appearance of the giant is no longer the same. The helmet has been removed, and he wears a wig. The lance has been replaced by a war hammer. The Sabre appeared beside the body in 1700. In 1703, during the construction of the new Gayant, the painter Martin Saint Leger was charged to paint specific colors for each giant. The helmet was reinstated, and then between 1724 and 1741, the giant wore a cap of rabbit fur. Absent from 1792 to 1801, its return is marked by the will to equip Gayant with the fashion of the day (Consulate). In 1823, the feudal style returned. The artist Wallet then draws corresponding clothing of the time of Francis I. The sketches of Wallet were used as the model for all the restorations. Although in 1827, a cotton coat was added as well as a streamer of scarlet serge on the upper part of the lance.

== Footnotes ==
=== Documentaries ===
The Gayant are the stars of the documentary "Giant!" by Thomas Deshays, released in France on March 21, 2018.

=== Bibliography ===
==== General books ====
- René Darré, Géants d'hier et d'aujourd'hui, 90 p.
- Claude Malbranke, Guide de Flandre et Artois mystérieux, p. 92-96, éditions Presse Pocket, 1966.
- Robert Chaussois, Les Géants Du Nord-Pas-De-Calais, édition Téméraire, 1999, ISBN 2843990343.
- Francis David, Claudine Le tourneur d'ison, Le réveil des Géants, édition Hoebeke, 2002.

==== Specific books ====
- M. Quenson, Gayant ou le Géant de Douai, édition F.C. Houtland, 1991 (first edition, 1839).
- Marie-France Gueusquin, Monique Mestayer, Gayant, fêtes et géants de Douai, Béthune, Documents d'Ethnographie Régionale du Nord-Pas-de-Calais, no. 5, 1994.

== See also ==
- Processional giants and dragons in Belgium and France
- Giant
- Masterpieces of the Oral and Intangible Heritage of Humanity
