= Ducasse de Mons =

Traditional folk festival in Mons, Belgium

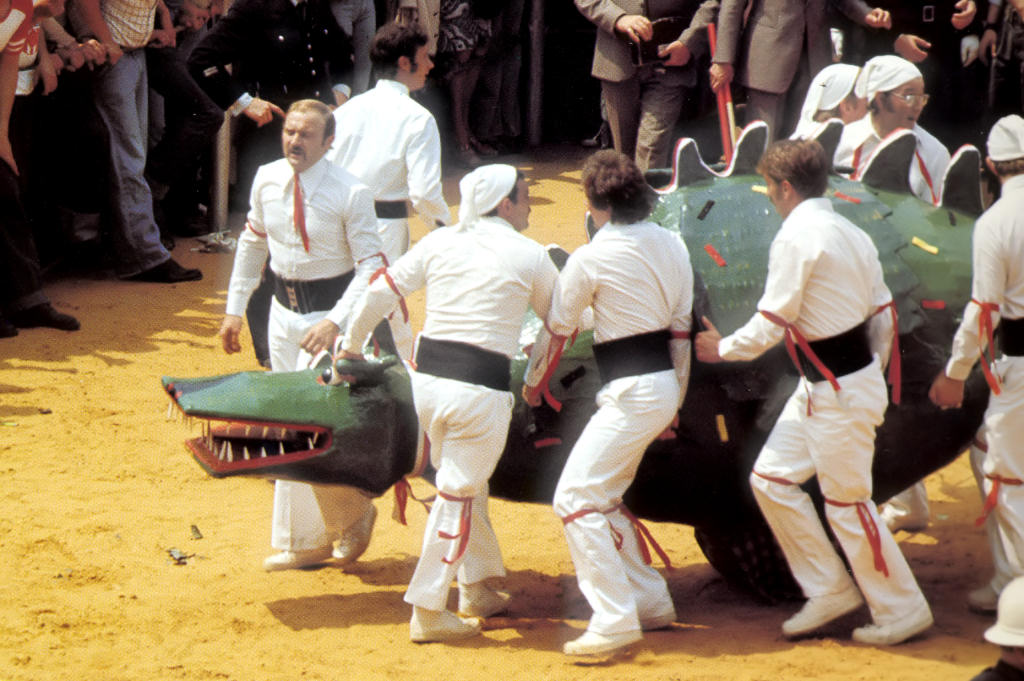
- The fight called Lumeçon (the dragon and the white men pictured)
- Status: Active
- Frequency: Annual
- Location: Mons
- Country: Belgium

Processional giants and dragons in Belgium and France
- UNESCO Intangible Cultural Heritage
- Country: Belgium
- Reference: 00153
- Region: Europe and North America

Inscription history
- Inscription: 2008 (3rd session)
- List: Representative

The Ducasse de Mons, also commonly known as the Doudou, is a traditional folk festival held in Mons, Hainaut, Belgium, on Trinity Sunday (57 days after Easter). The feast comprises two important parts: the procession, including taking Saint Waltrude's shrine down from its altar and placing it on a dray, as well as the combat named Lumeçon between Saint George and a dragon. Since 2008, it has been recognised as a Masterpiece of the Oral and Intangible Heritage of Humanity by UNESCO.

== History ==
The Ducasse de Mons or Doudou originates in the Middle Ages. Its origins are difficult to pin down exactly. It has been attested since the 13th century (the first known mention dates from 1248). It is a procession or ducasse (Note: The French word ducasse refers to a procession; the Processional Giants of Ath and Mons are part of each city's ducasse.) with act of "circumambulation" around a religious symbol (e.g. a statue of the city's patron saint), in Latin circumambulatio or amburbium, which can be found in many religions and beliefs.

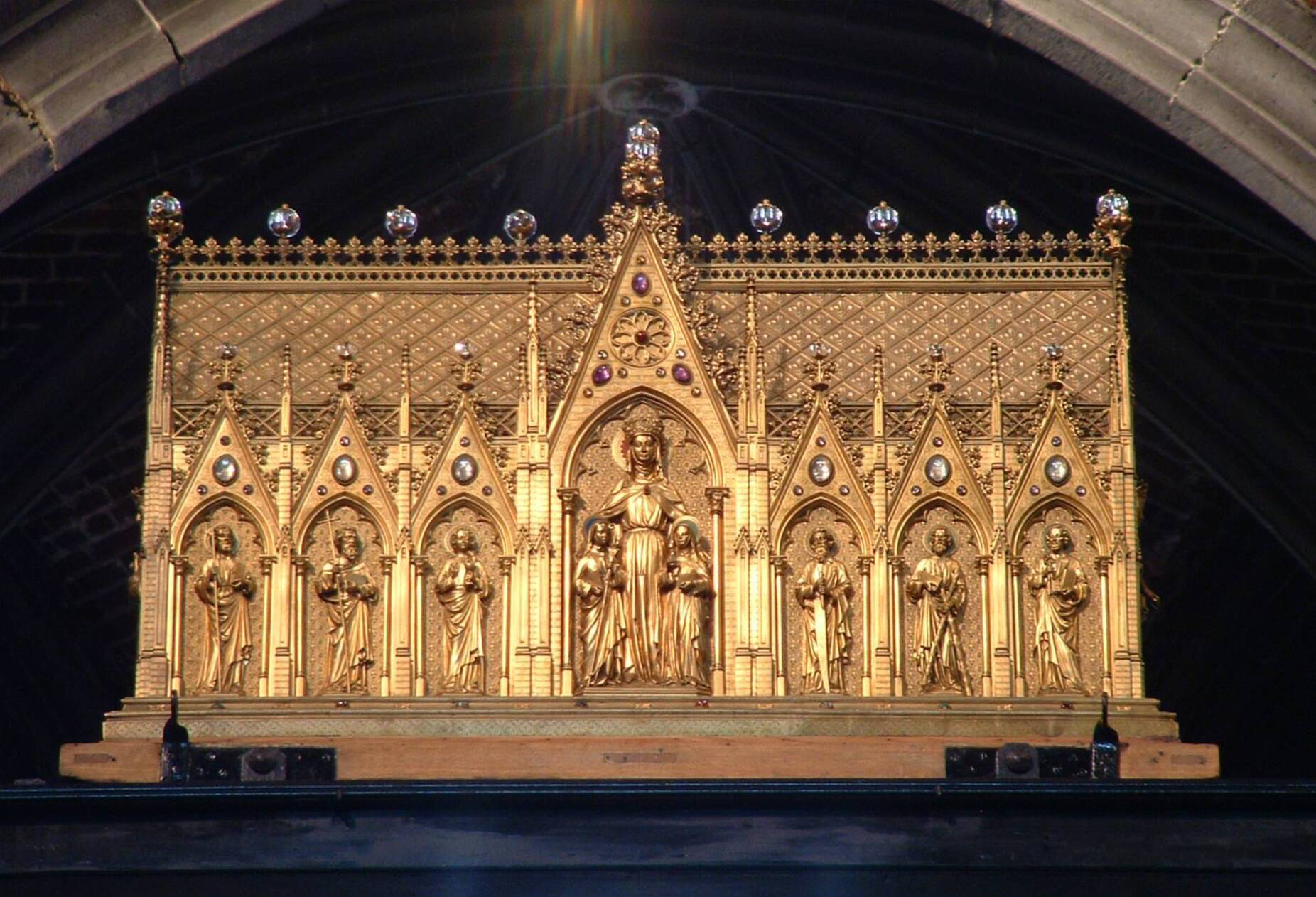
The shrine of Saint Waltrude

A tenacious but erroneous legend connects the Ducasse to the plague. In 1349, because Mons was touched by a plague epidemic (the famous Black Death), the authorities decided to organise a procession with the shrine of Saint Waltrude, the city's patroness. The shrine was brought to Casteau (a little village located between Mons and Soignies that has been the location of SHAPE since 1967). At the same time, the shrine of Vincent Madelgarus (Waltrude's husband) that was based in Soignies was also taken to the same place. After this procession, the plague disappeared. The miracle was attributed to Saint Waudru and it was decided to repeat the procession every year.

Through the following decades, what was originally a religious procession took on gradually a more worldly outlook. In 1352, the date was fixed on Trinity Sunday. After 1380, the fraternity of Saint George appeared in the procession, made up of members of the nobility, the city's mayor and aldermen. From 1440, the reconstitution of the combat between Saint George and a dragon took its place in the feast. The separation between the religious parts of the feast and the non religious began at this time. As the procession gradually acquired a more secular character, it became a social event in which all the city's constituents participate.

During the second half of the 16th century, the Ducasse was dependent on political and religious upheavals in the Spanish Low Countries. In 1786, the combat of Saint George and the dragon was suppressed following an edict promulgated by Emperor Joseph II of Austria. Another vicissitude, French revolutionaries suppressed the game in 1794. The Concordat of 1801 restored the procession and the fight. The procession did not take place in 1803. Because of the "less religious" origin, the combat was excluded once again from the procession in 1819 following measures taken by King William I of the Netherlands.

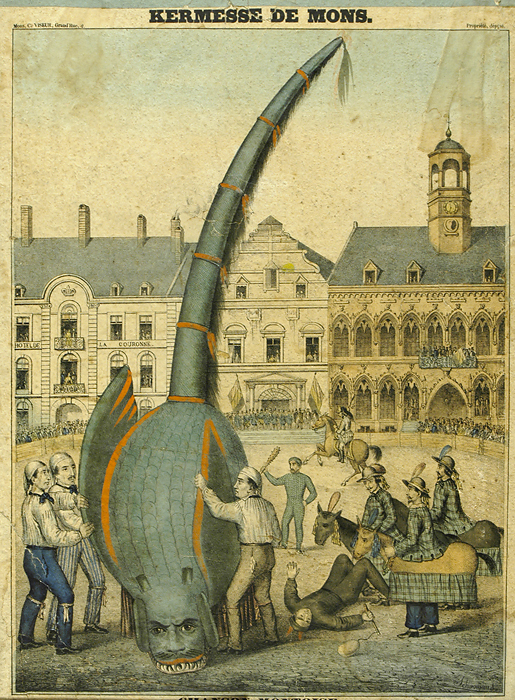
19th-century engraving showing the combat of Saint George and the dragon

The tradition continued during the 19th and 20th centuries with more or less success. It was around 1930, under the impetus of Canon Edmond Puissant, that the procession regained its vigour, thanks to the creation of new groups and a renewal of costumes. Between 1973 and the 2000s, the game was reviewed and structured in the sense of diegesis (a style of fictional storytelling) by Georges Raepers, lawyer at the Bar Association of Mons. The celebrations were not held during World War I and World War II, as well as in 2020 and 2021 due to the COVID-19 pandemic in Belgium.

In 2008, the Ducasse de Mons was recognised as one of the Masterpieces of the Oral and Intangible Heritage of Humanity by UNESCO, as part of the bi-national inscription 'Processional giants and dragons in Belgium and France'.

== Planning ==
The feast begins from the Saturday before Trinity Sunday to the next Sunday. As an eight-day festival with a specific liturgy, it can be called an octave.

=== The Procession ===
The descent of the shrine takes place on the Saturday evening. During a religious ceremony, the shrine is taken down from its altar. The priest gives the shrine (kept all year in the Collegiate Church of St. Waudru) to the town authorities for the duration of the festival. Then a procession with torches begins in the streets of the town.

On the morning of Trinity Sunday, the shrine is placed on the Car d'Or ("Golden Chariot"), which is a gilded dray, and the procession begins. The Car d’Or is pulled through the streets by draft horses. The carriage is accompanied by several guilds that represent the history of the region. At the end of the procession, the Car d’Or has to climb a steep, cobblestone street, the Rampe Sainte-Waudru. To help the horses with the immense weight, hundreds of people gather behind to push. Local superstition holds that if the Car d'Or does not reach the top of the hill in one go, the city will suffer great misfortune. This happened in 1803, due to the French Revolution, as well as in 1914 and in 1940, just prior to the two world wars.

=== The game of Saint George ===
This game is played on the Trinity Sunday between 12:30 (p.m.) and 13:00 (1 p.m.). It represents the fight between Saint George (the good) and the dragon (the evil). The fight is called Lumeçon. This name comes from the old French name Limaçon (old French name meaning a spectacle with horses that made circular movements.)

The combat happens on the Grand-Place of Mons. The length of the dragon is about 10 metres (33 ft). The end of his tail is covered with horses' hairs (mane). The dragon is displaced with the help of the white men (French: Hommes blancs). Saint George is protected by the Chinchins who represent dogs. The dragon is helped by the devils (French: Les diables). Each devil is armed with an inflated cow's bladder (the balloon in the past before plastic had been developed). With this weapon, they knock the Chinchins and the crowed in the arena. The dragon attacks Saint George with his tail. The dragon also attacks the crowd, making the crowd important participants. People try to take the mane of the tail because it is said to bring luck for a year. Finally, there are also the Leaf men (French: Hommes de feuilles) that are covered with real leaves of ivy. They help the dragon by defending and supporting his tail.

The combat is precisely choreographed. Saint George on his horse turns clockwise, and the dragon turns in the other direction (this is a reference to good versus evil). Saint George tries to kill the dragon with his lance but the lance always breaks on contacting the dragon's skin. Saint George uses a pistol and finally kills the dragon on the third try. At 13:00 (1 p.m.), the participants leave the square, people rush into the arena to find the last lucky manes which have fallen on the ground. And the carillon of Mons rings.

== Other information ==
- A big concert is organised on the Friday evening before Trinity weekend on the Grand-Place of Mons, during which military bands from all over the world play music, and a braderie (street clearance sale) is organised on the Monday after.
- Another combat is organised on the following Sunday. The combat is reserved for children (public and actors). The dragon is lighter than the original.
- The streets of the centre of the town are a pedestrian zone during the festivities. These streets are full of people listening to music, eating Belgian chips, barbecuing, and drinking Belgian beer and carbonated drinks.

== Gallery ==
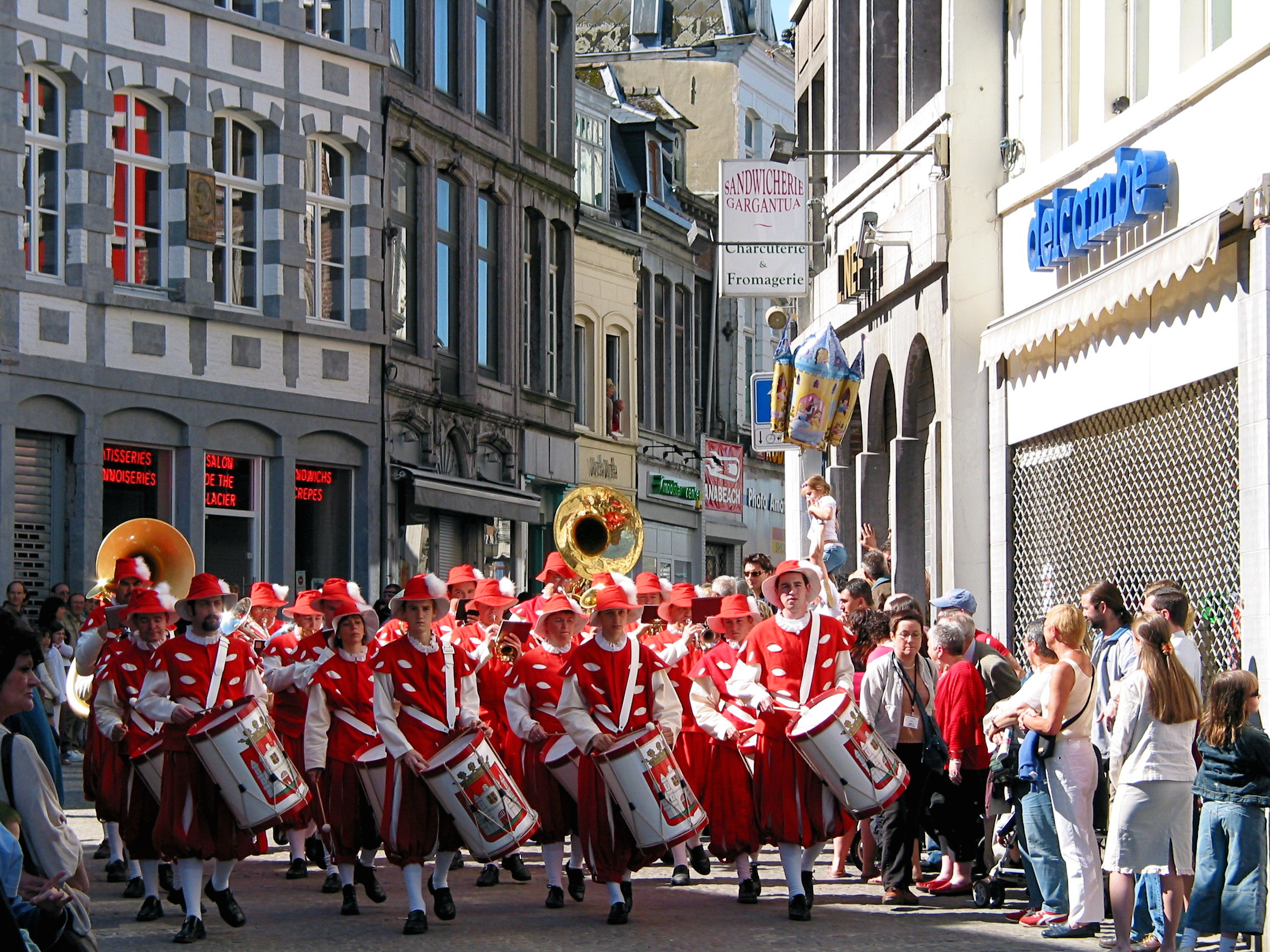
Procession of the Car d'Or

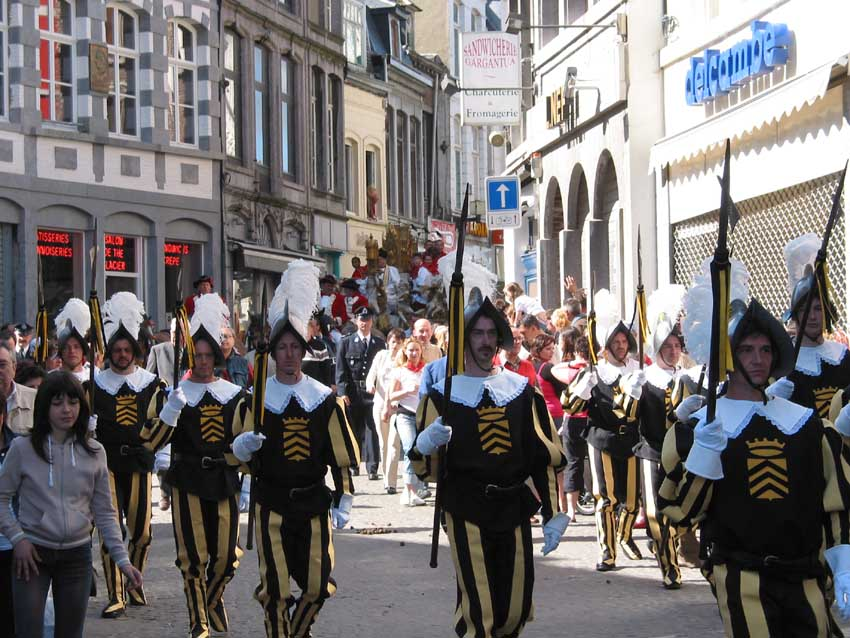
Procession of the Car d'Or

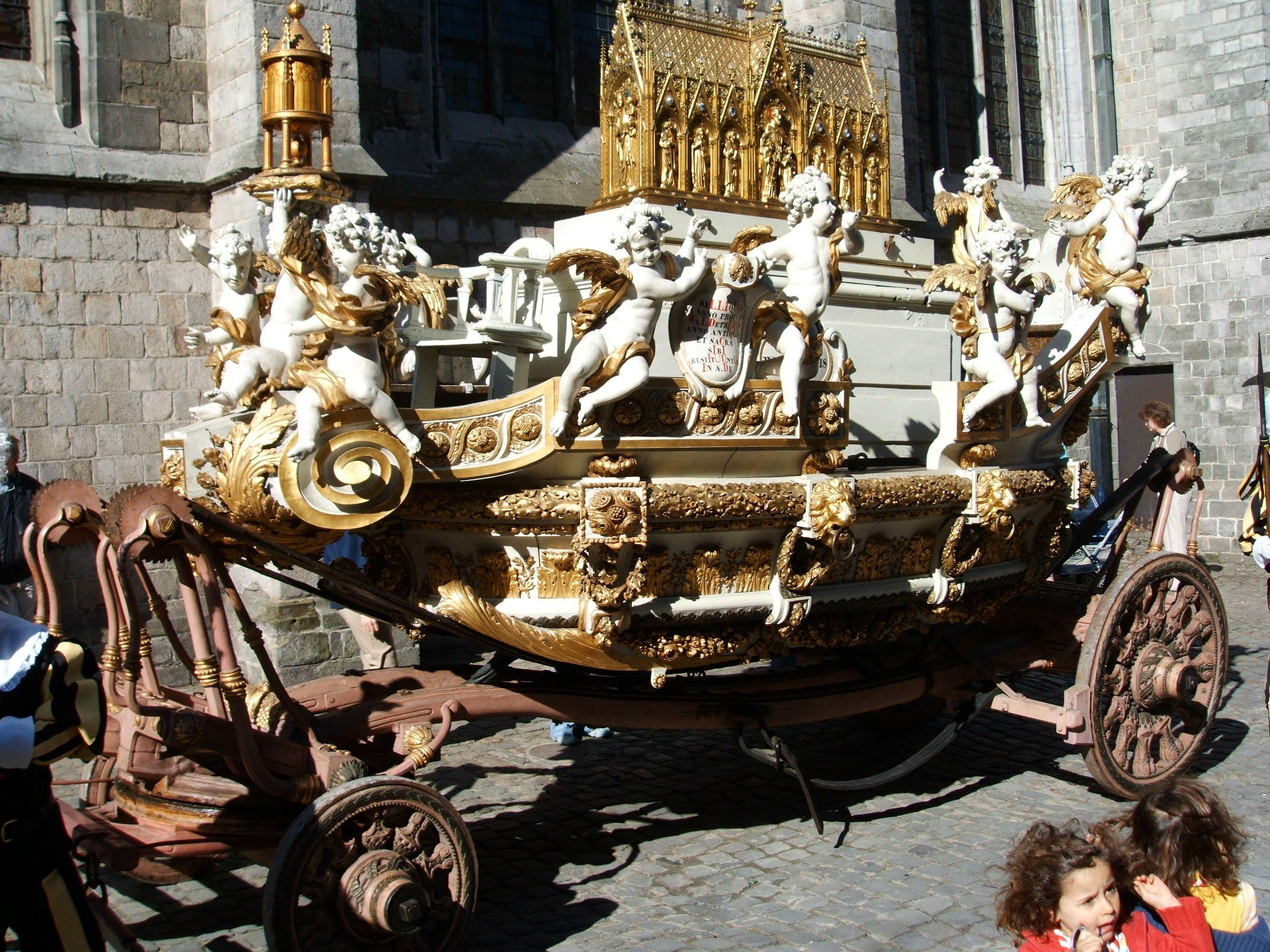
The Car d'Or

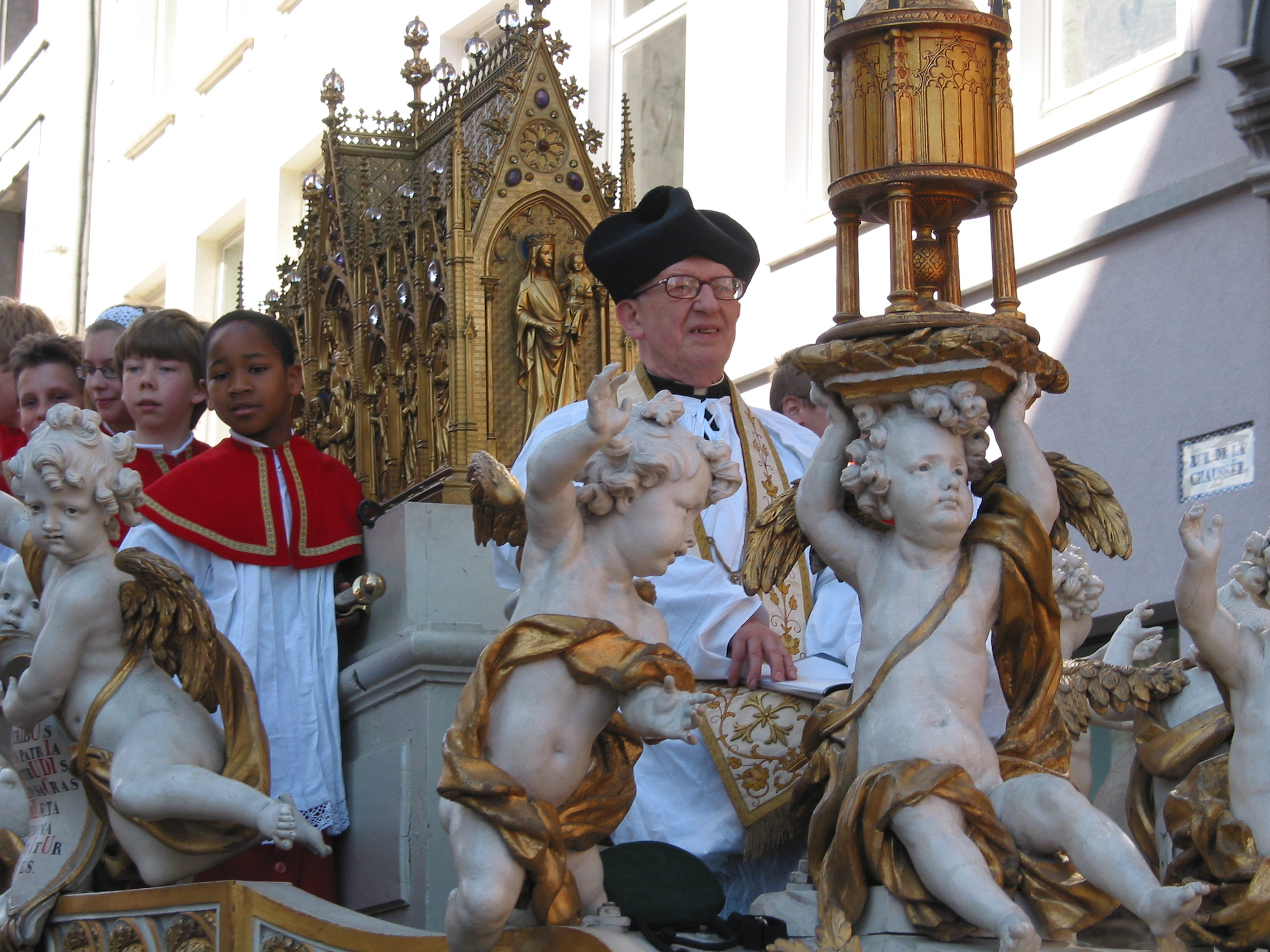
Shrine on the Car d'Or

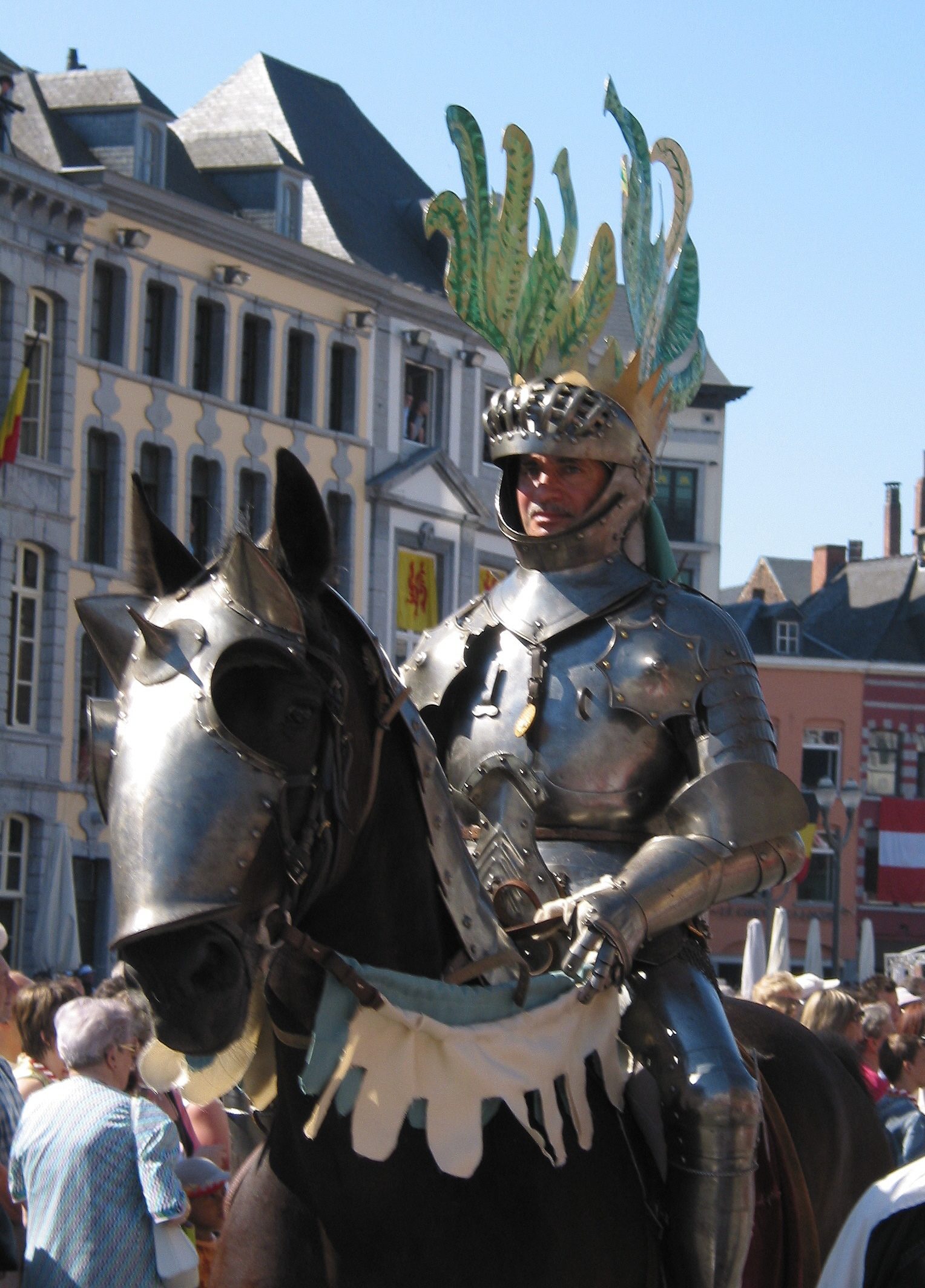
The Iron man

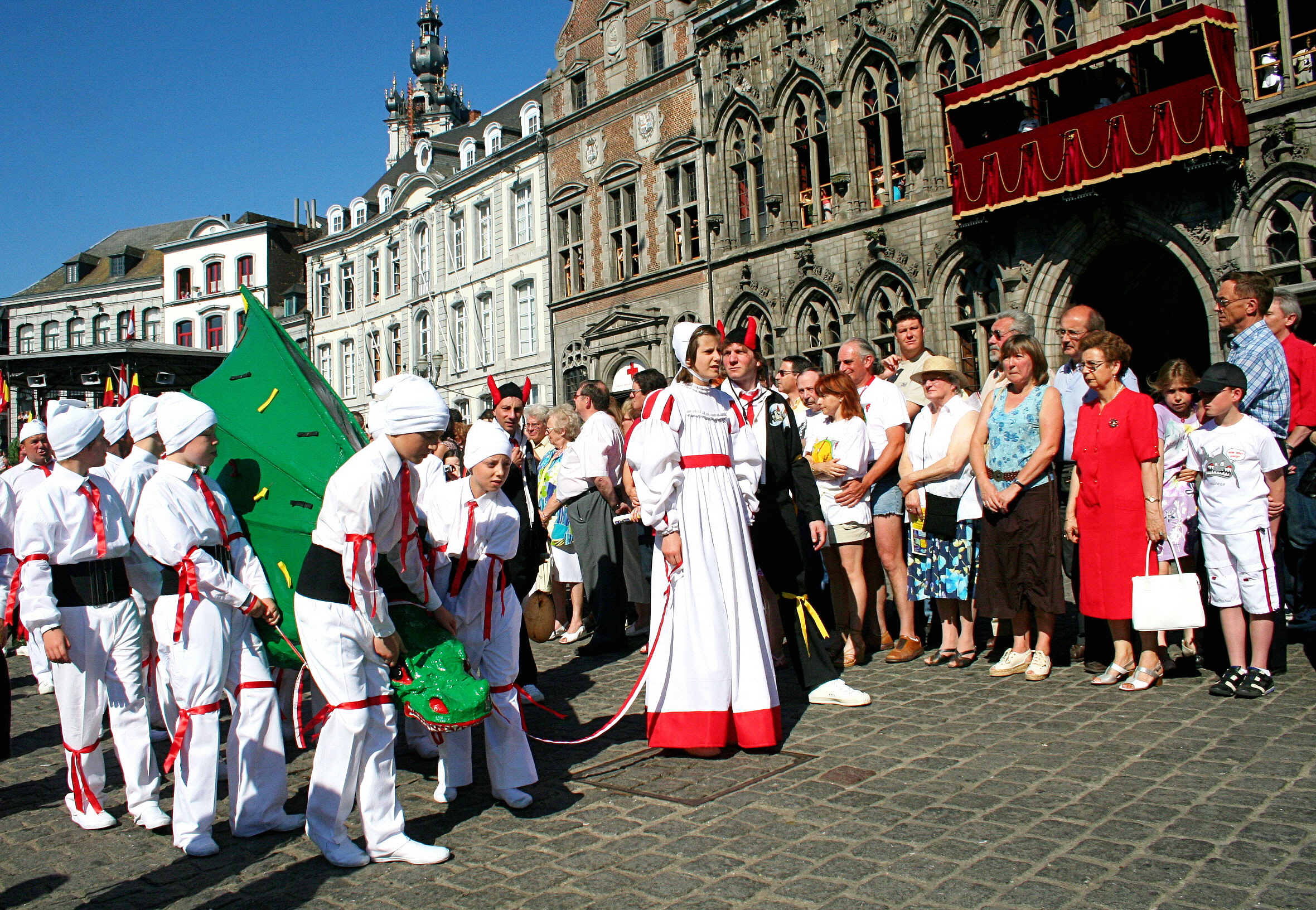
The little dragon for the kids' day

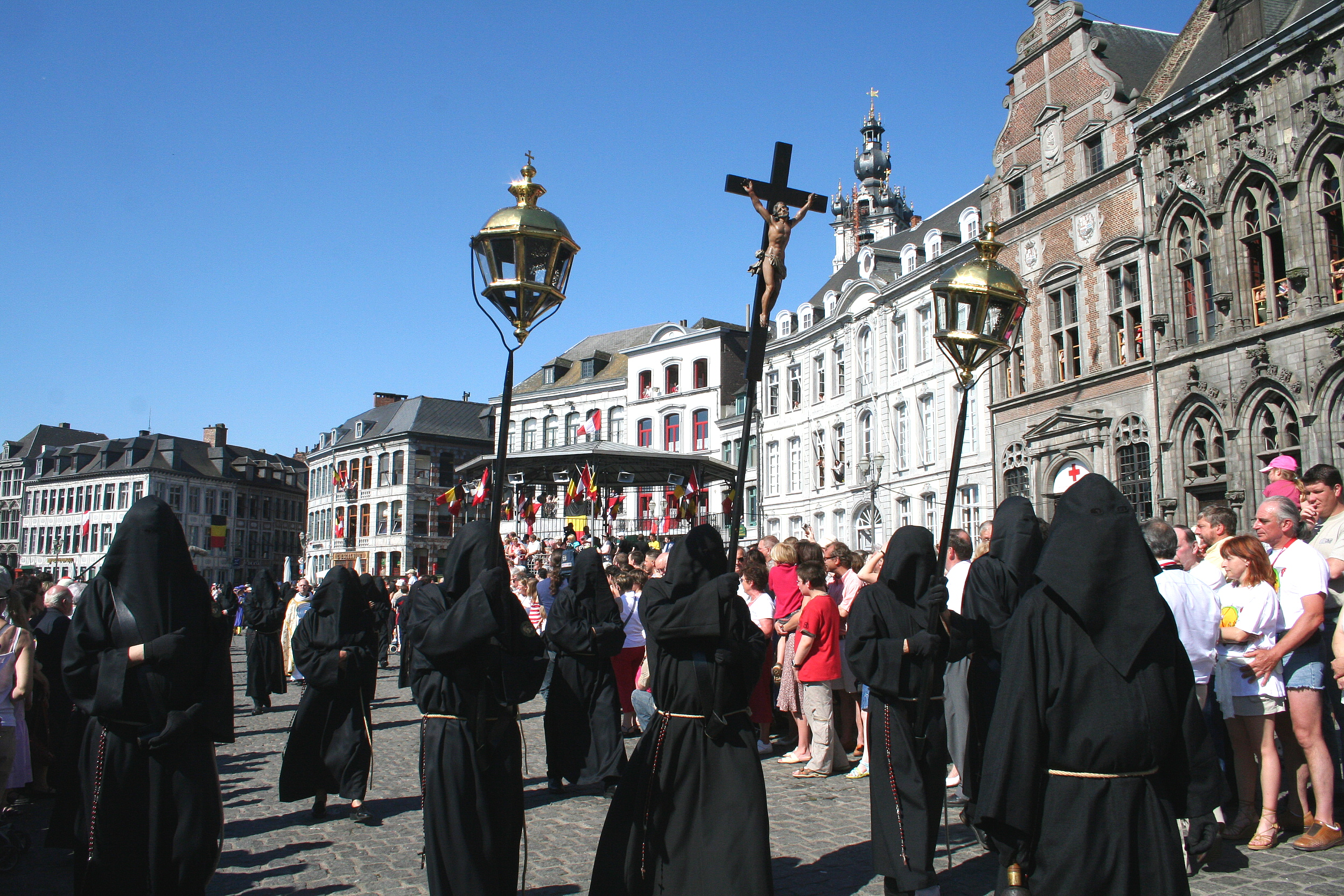
A fraternity named Beubeux

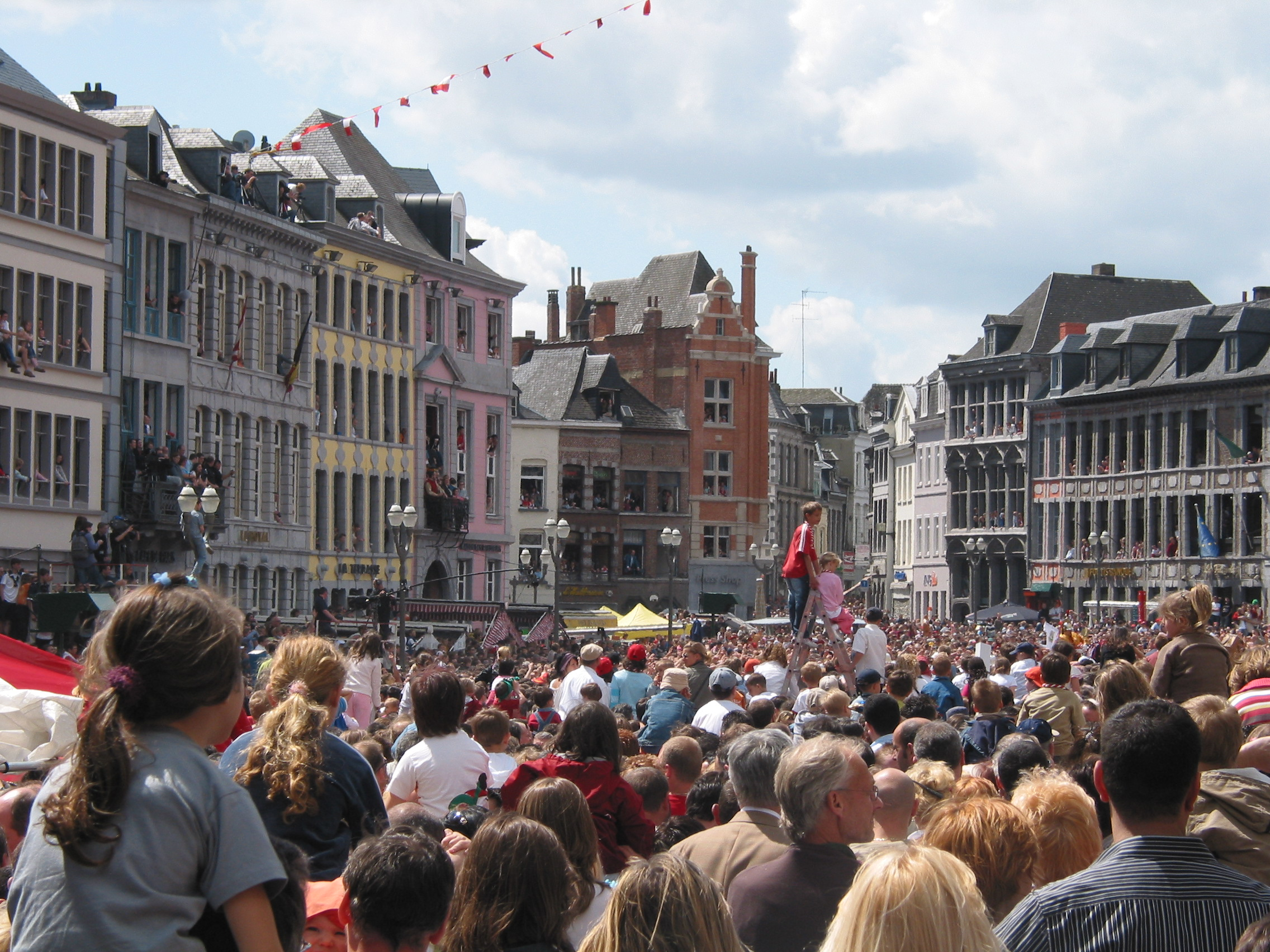
Peoples after the combat on the Grand-Place

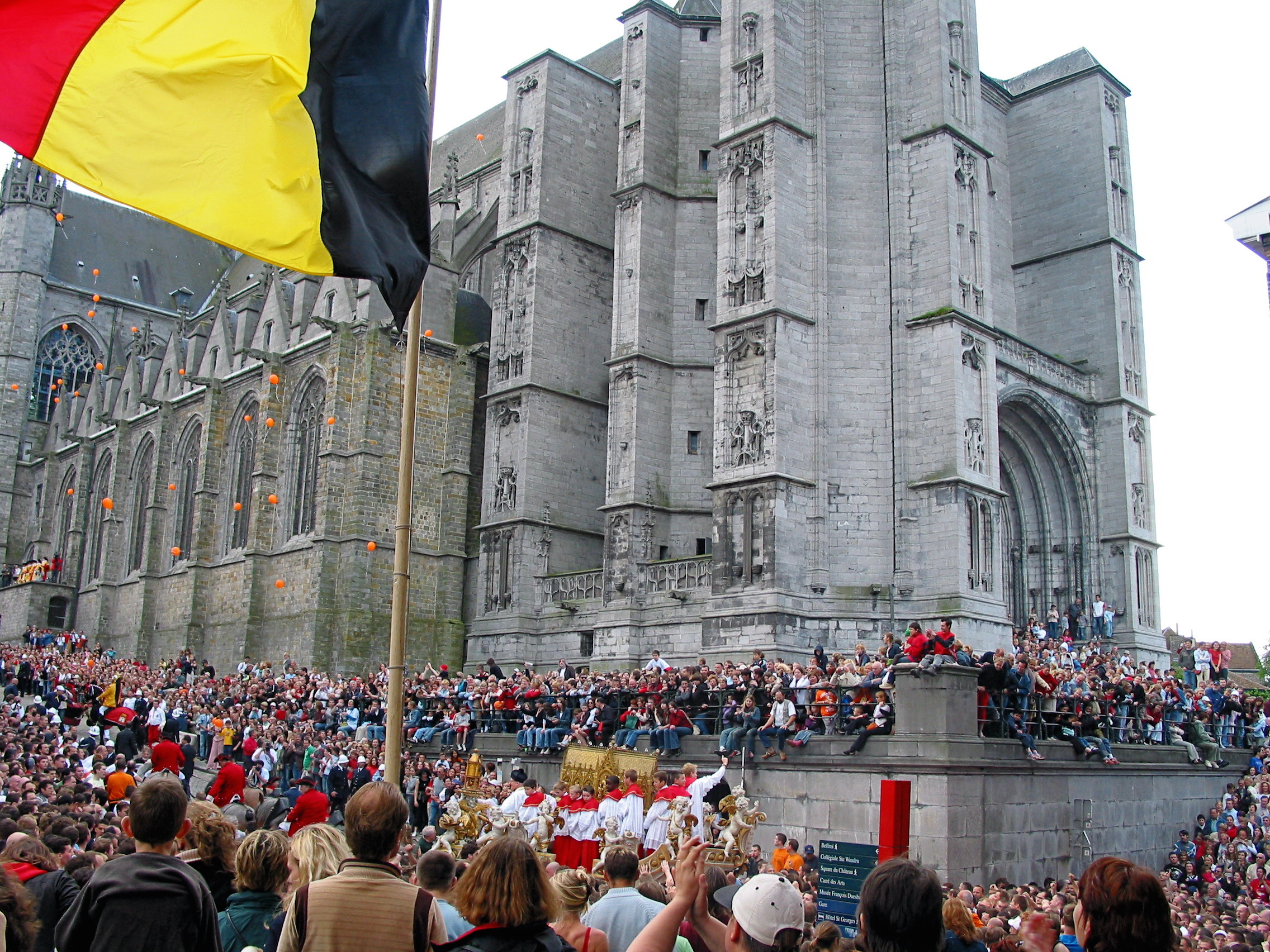
Raising of the Car d'Or on the Rampe Sainte-Waudru

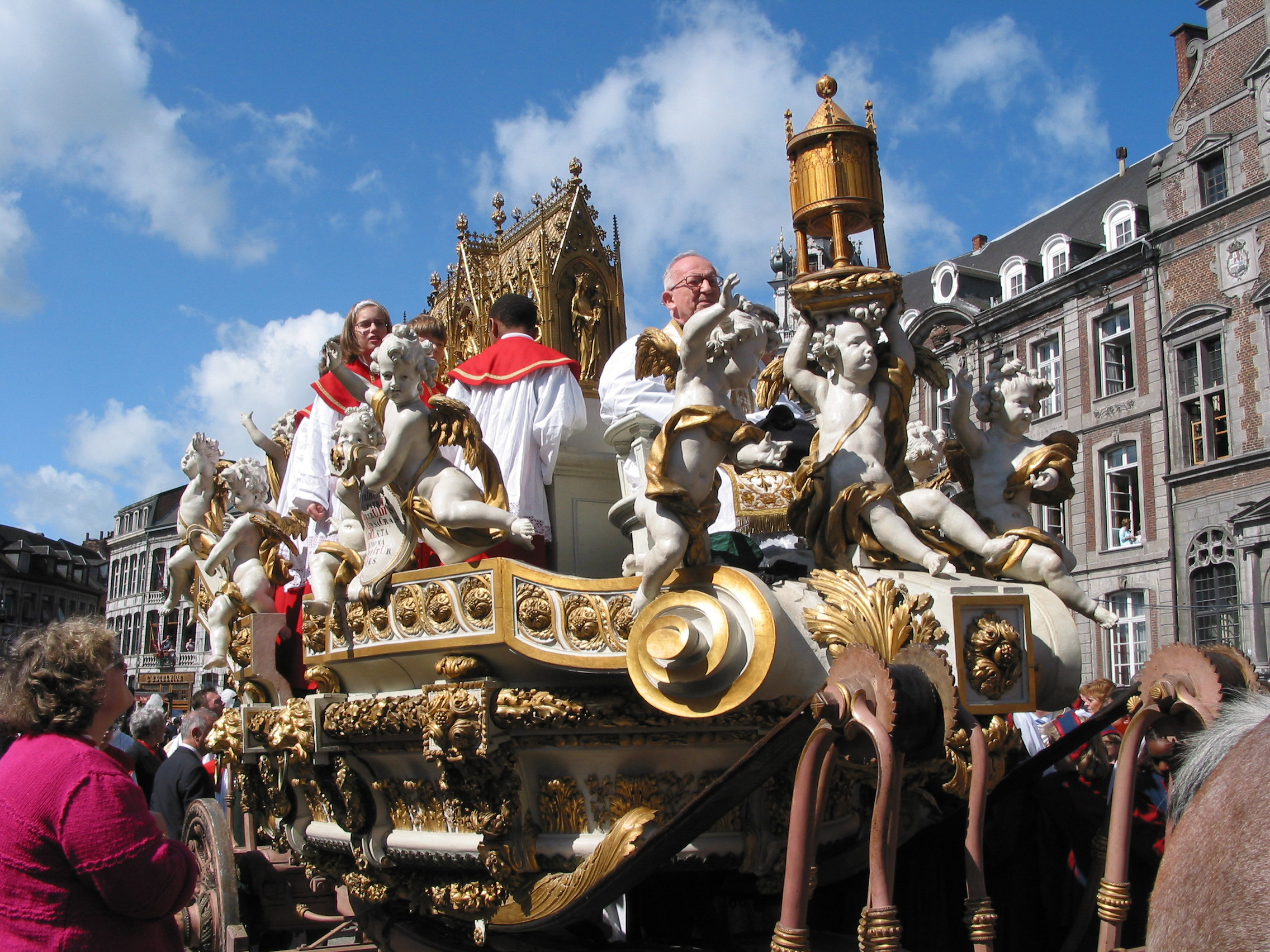
The Car d'Or arrives at the Grand-Place

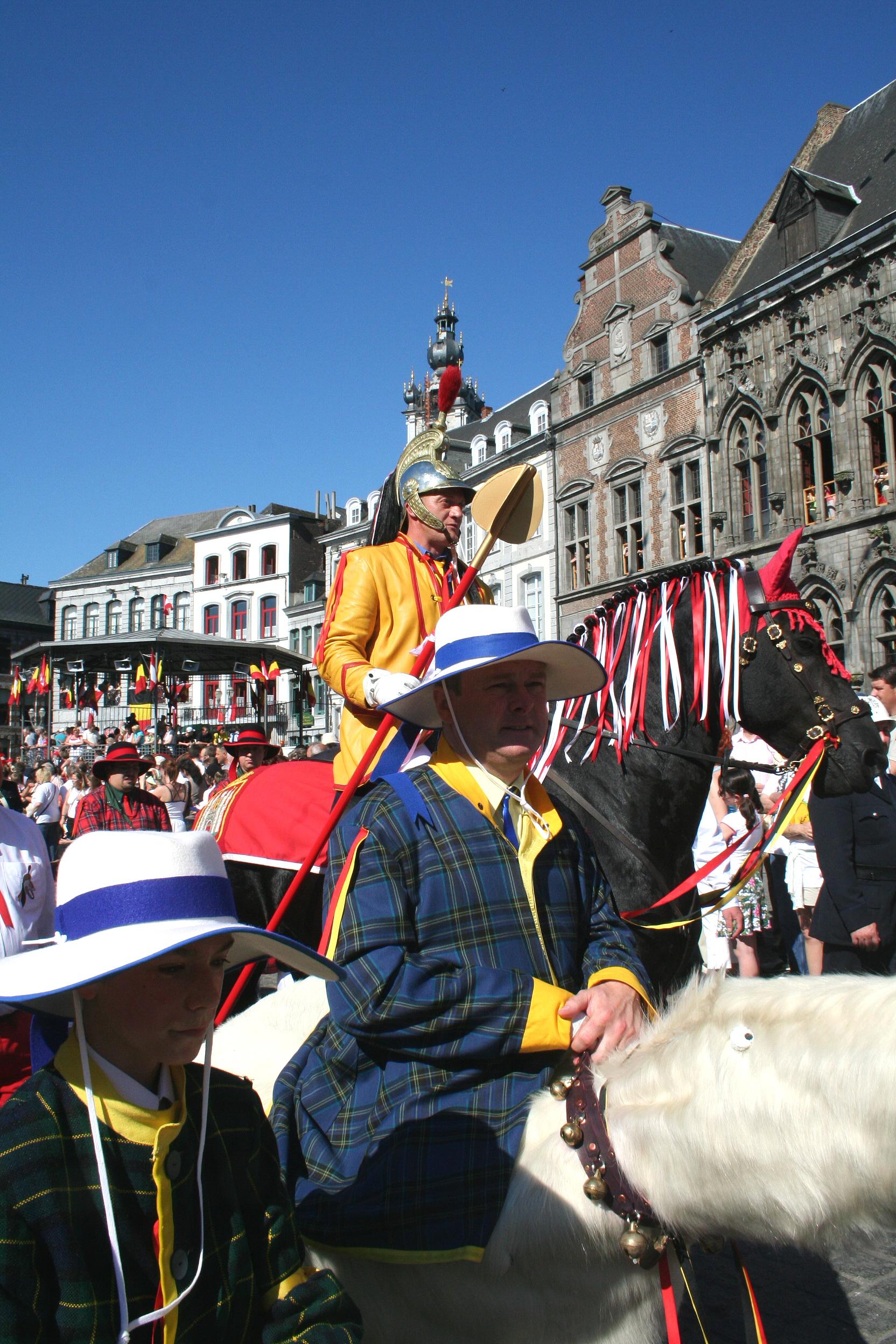
Saint George and the Chinchins

== Bibliography ==
- Bowker, John (1999). The Oxford Dictionary of World Religions. New York: Oxford University Press. ISBN 0-19-866242-4.
- Goblet d'Alviella, Eugène (1908). Circumambulation in: Encyclopædia of Religion and Ethics. Vol. 3. Edinburgh: T. & T. Clark.
