= Processional giants and dragons in Belgium and France =

Folkloric manifestations and UNESCO Intangible Cultural Heritage

- UNESCO Intangible Cultural Heritage
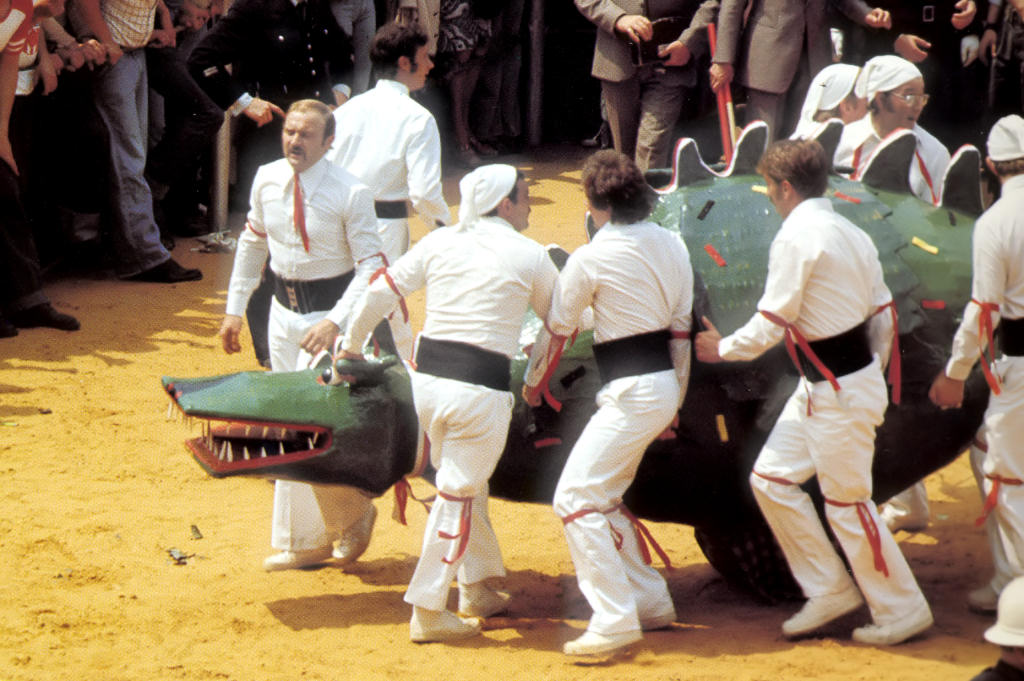
- Ducasse de Mons
- Country: Belgium and France
- Reference: 00153
- Region: Europe and North America

Inscription history
- Inscription: 2008 (3rd session)
- List: Representative

The processional giants and dragons (French: Géants et dragons processionnels) of Belgium and France are a set of folkloric manifestations involving processional giants, which have been inscribed by UNESCO on the lists of Intangible Cultural Heritage in 2008, originally proclaimed in November 2005.

Through these festivals and their giants, this concerns the set of gigantic manifestations specific to each country. In the case of Belgium, these are the festivities of Dendermonde (Ommegang van Dendermonde), Mechelen (Ommegang van Mechelen), Mons (the Ducasse de Mons, and the fight which is named the "Lumeçon"), Ath (the Ducasse d'Ath) and Brussels (the Meyboom). For France, these are the feasts at Douai (feasts of Gayant) and Cassel (carnival) and the totemic animals and their celebrations in Tarascon and Pézenas (Mardi Gras, inauguration of the Mirondela dels Arts on the first Sunday in July).

This proclamation allows for a valorisation of these popular festivals and their protection.

== Background ==
The processional giant is a gigantic costumed figure that represents a fictitious or real being. Inherited from medieval rites, tradition has it that it is carried, and that it dances in the streets during processions or festivals. Its physiognomy and size are variable, and its name-giving varies according to the regions; among the Flemings, it is known by the name of reus, among the Picards it is called gayant. The large biblical figures in the procession also served the purpose of catechising a largely illiterate population.

== Belgium ==
Belgium has nearly 1500 giants on its soil. Their appearance dates back to the 15th century; Goliath of Nivelles, which is mentioned as early as 1457, is the oldest known Belgian giant. Belgium also has the largest giant in Europe; Jean Turpin of Nieuwpoort, which exceeds 11 metres (36 ft).

The Belgian cultural heritage includes the following events:

- Ducasse d'Ath (withdrawn in 2022)
- Ducasse de Mons
- Meyboom of Brussels
- Ommegang van Dendermonde
- Ommegang van Mechelen
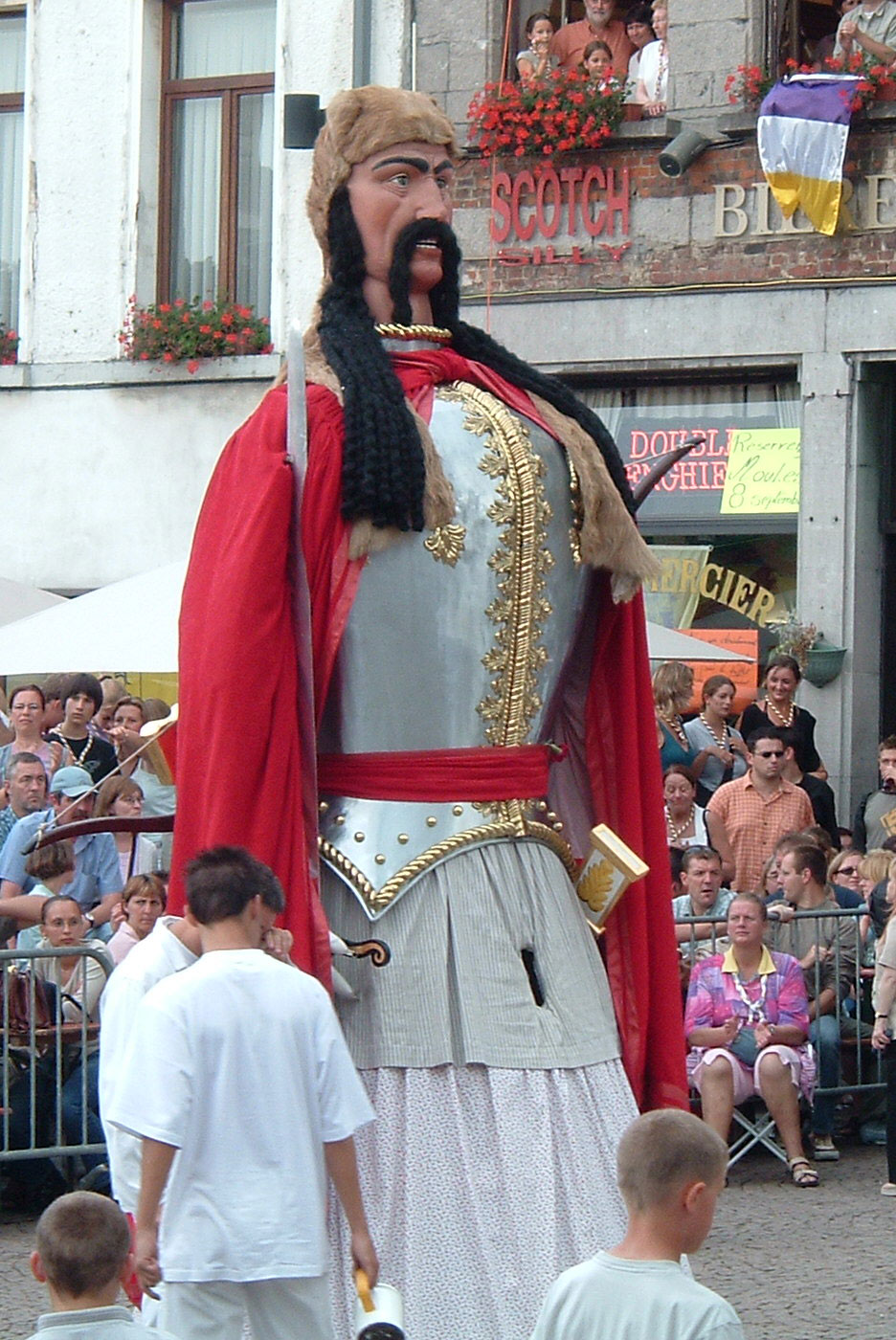
The giant Ambiorix at the Ducasse d'Ath, Belgium

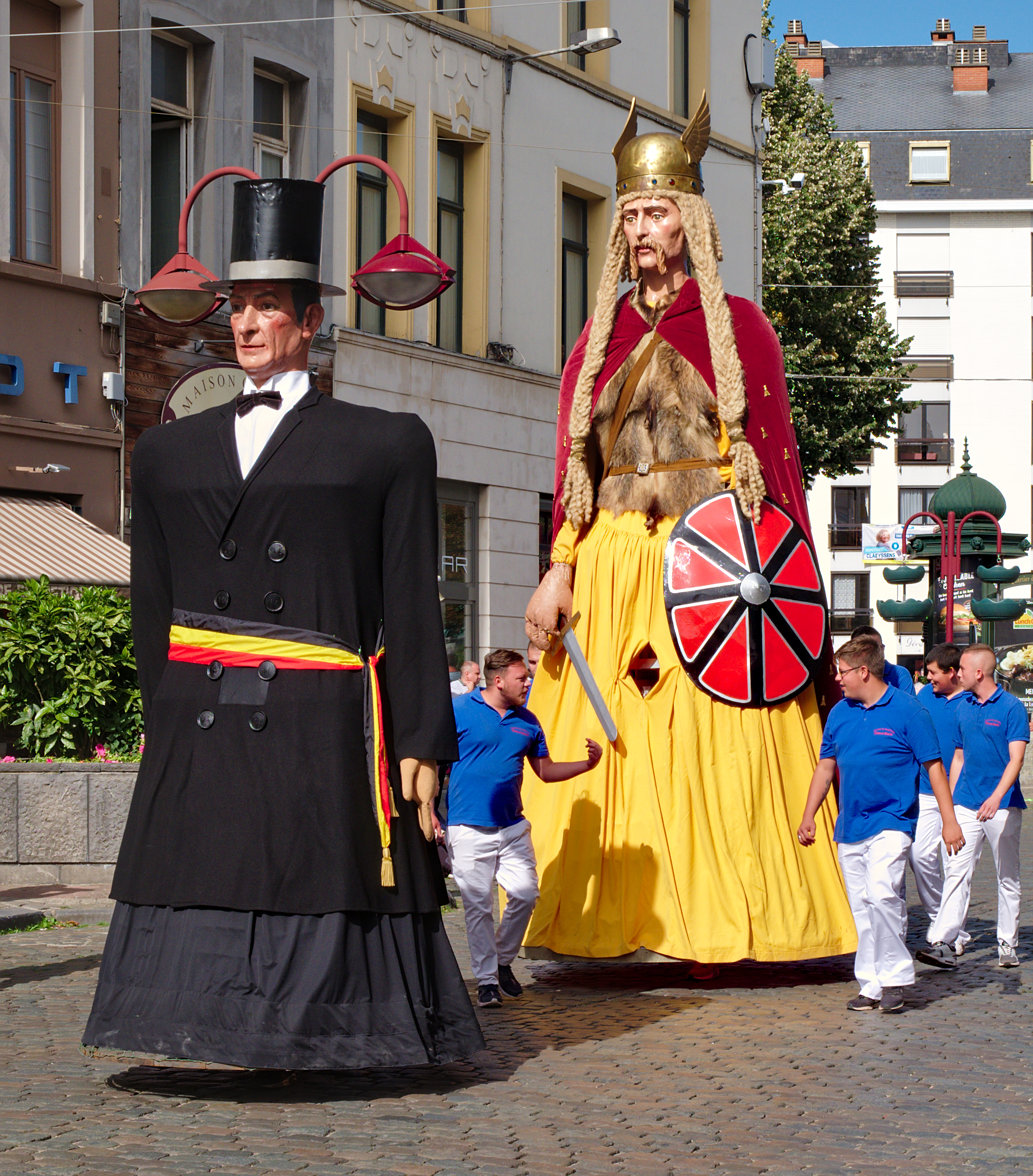
Giants of Tournai, Belgium

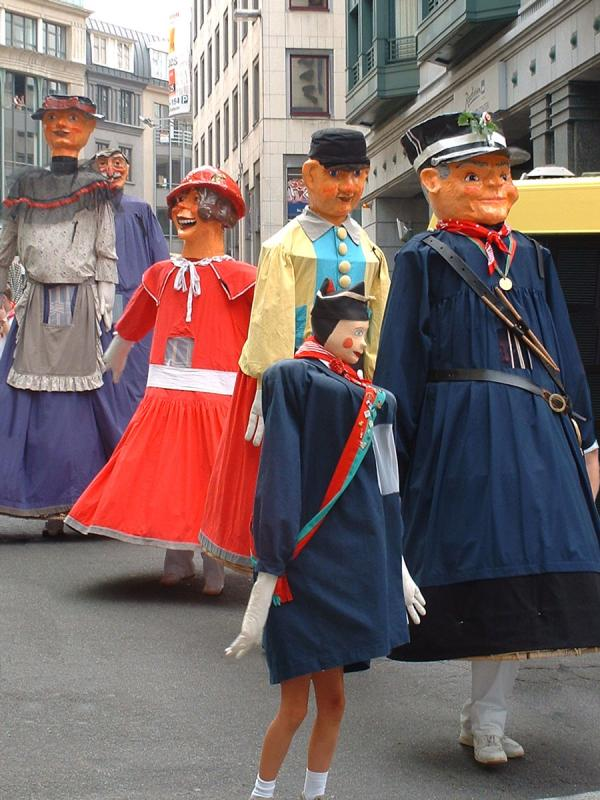
Giants of the Meyboom of Brussels

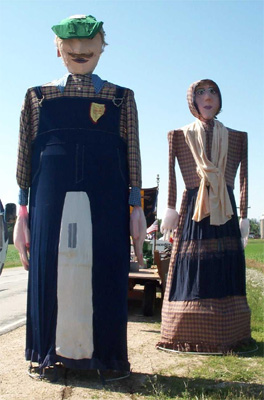
Giants of Belgian American community in Brussels, Wisconsin

== France ==
The giant is one of the symbols of the Nord-Pas-de-Calais region. It is the object of ancestral cultural practices that are still kept alive. Present at regional festivals and events, he represents the northern community.

The region currently has more than 450 giants, spread over the whole territory. There are nevertheless more dynamic intra-regional zones, located around central points. The Flemish part of the region is a land of giants; each city has one or more of them. Examples include Reuze Papa and Reuze Maman of Cassel, Tisje Tasje of Hazebrouck, Jean de Bûcheron and La Belle Hélène in Steenvoorde, and Totor of Steenwerck. In the South, in the Languedoc region, there is the Pézenas colt, and in the Provence, the tarasque of Tarascon (Bouches-du-Rhône).

- Cassel: Reuze Papa and Reuze Maman
- Douai: Gayant, Marie Cagenon, Fillon, Jacquot, Binbin
- Pézenas: le Poulain
- Tarascon: la Tarasque
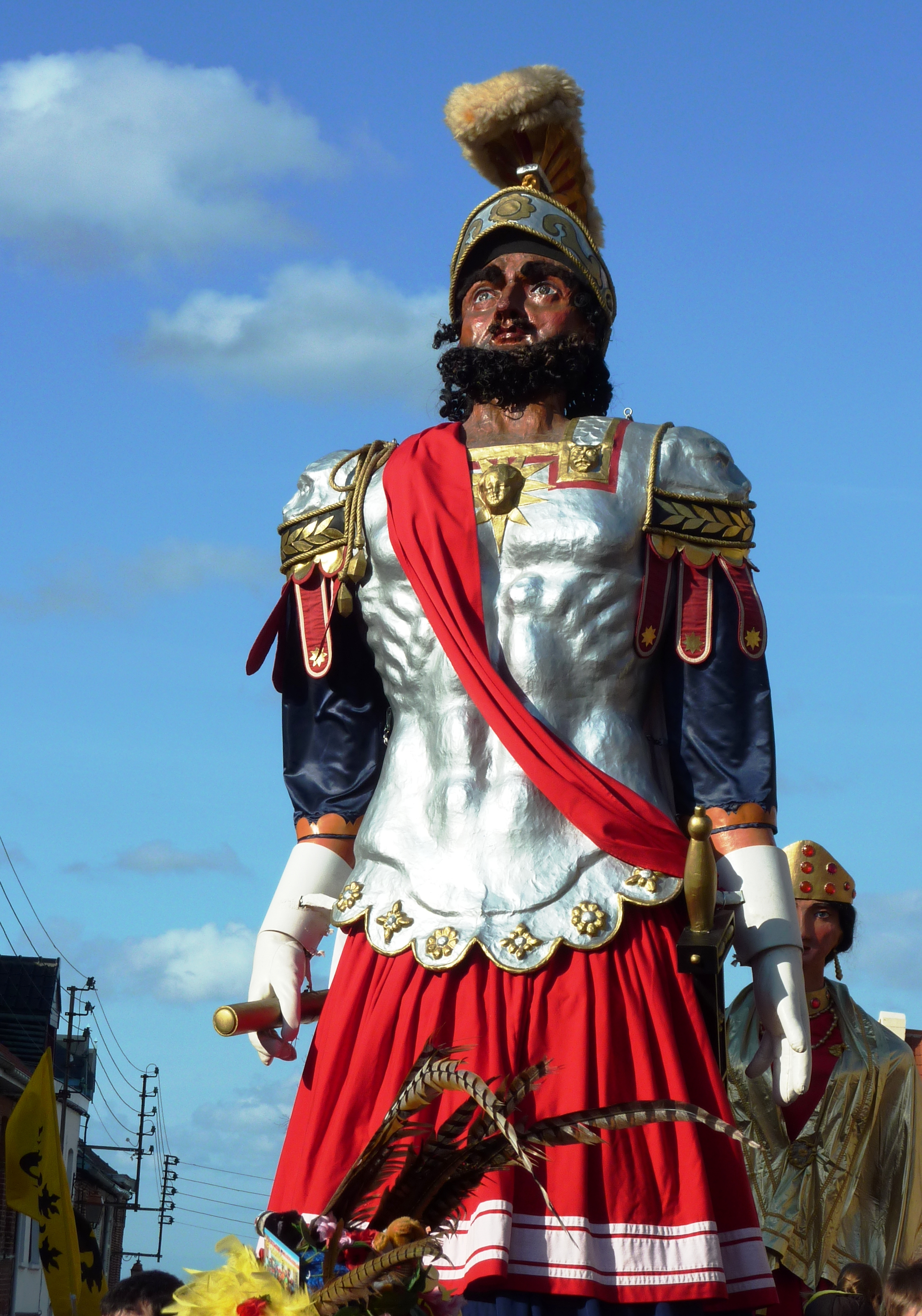
Reuze Papa of Cassel, France

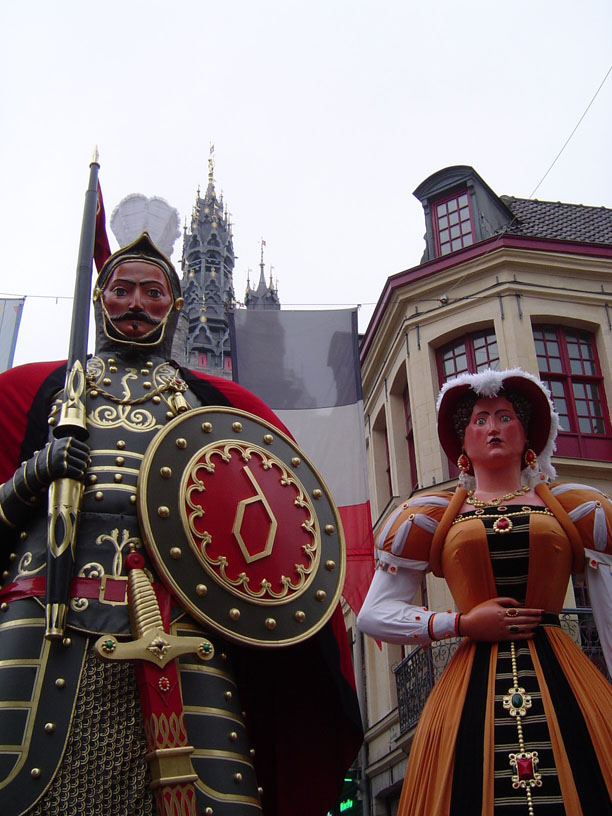
Giants couple; Gayant and Marie Cagenon, Douai, France

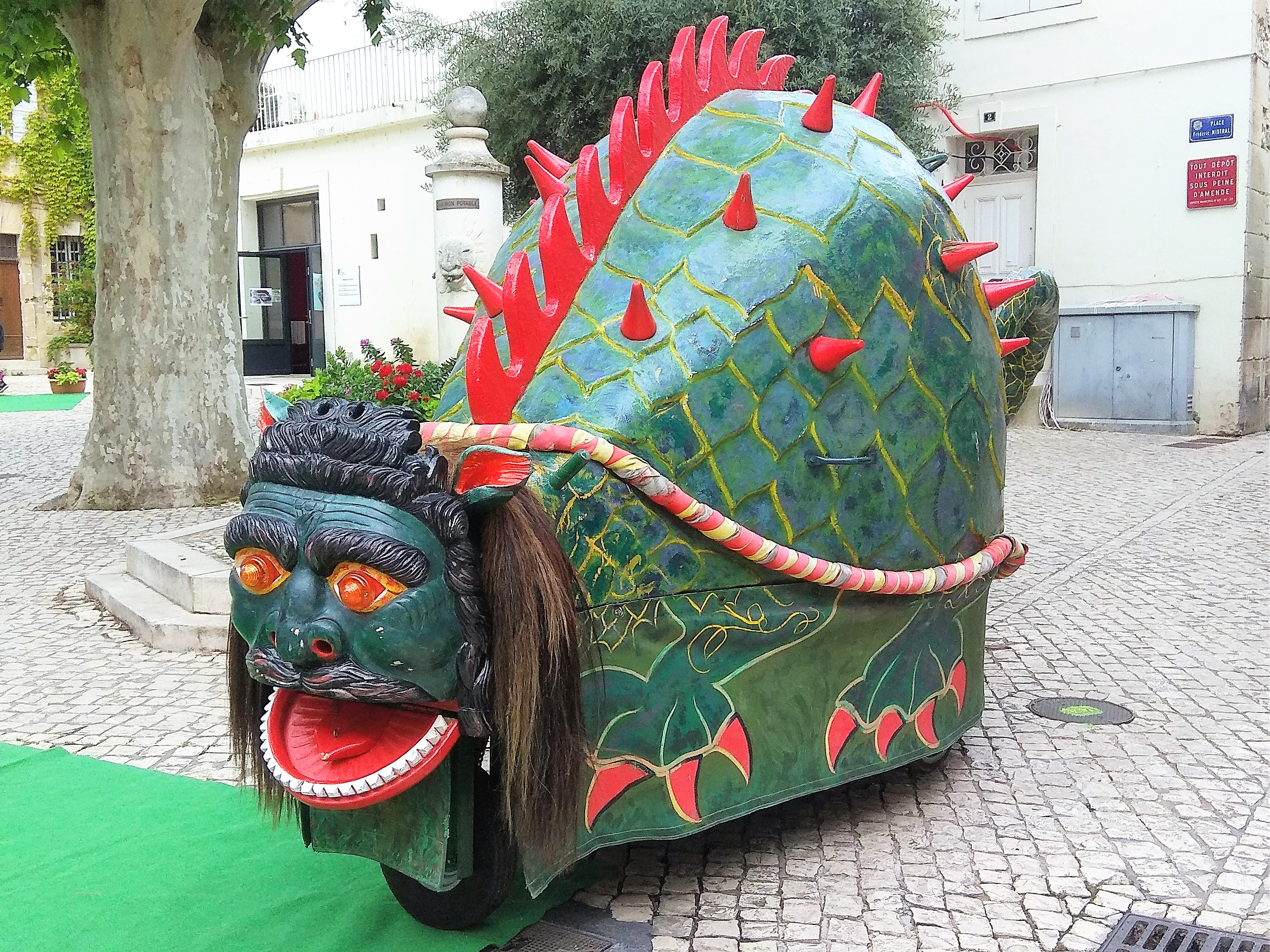
Fibreglass Tarasque in Tarascon, France

== See also ==
- Processional giant
- Animal representation in Western medieval art
