= Ducasse d'Ath =

Traditional folk festival in Ath, Belgium

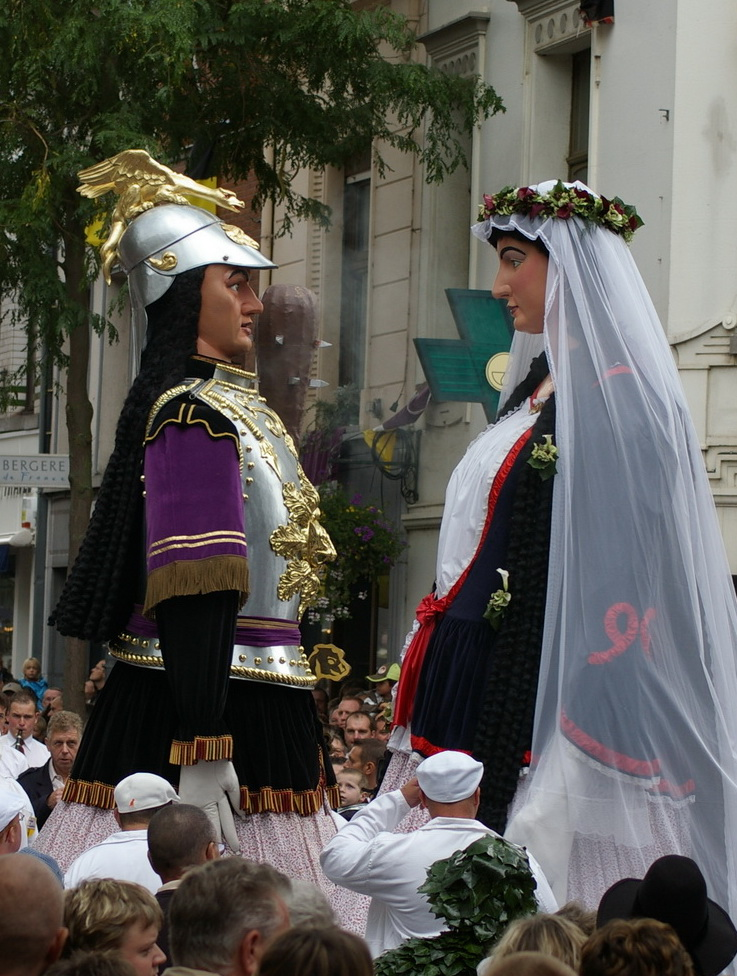
- Figures of Mr and Mrs Goliath
- Status: Active
- Frequency: Annual
- Location: Ath
- Country: Belgium

Processional giants and dragons in Belgium and France
- UNESCO Intangible Cultural Heritage
- Country: Belgium
- Reference: 00153
- Region: Europe and North America

Inscription history
- Inscription: 2008 (3rd session)
- List: Representative
- Delisted in 2022

The Ducasse d'Ath is a traditional folk festival held in Ath, Hainaut, Belgium, to mark the victory of David over Goliath. The parade is held annually on the fourth Sunday of August and is characterised by the presence of processional giants depicting the horse Bayard and several other characters from local history. From 2008 to 2022, it was recognised as a Masterpiece of the Oral and Intangible Heritage of Humanity by UNESCO.

== History ==
The city of Ath was founded in 1140 by Baldwin IV, Count of Hainaut, by buying territory from his liegeman, Gilles de Trazegnies. The city experienced considerable expansion in the 14th century, with a church dedicated to Saint Julian of Brioude coming up outside the enclosure of the walled city. The procession used to begin at the church and proceed to the new town. It is a procession or ducasse (Note: The French word ducasse refers to a procession; the Processional Giants of Ath and Mons are part of each city's ducasse.) with act of "circumambulation" around a religious symbol (e.g. a statue of the city's patron saint), in Latin circumambulatio or amburbium, which can be found in many religions and beliefs. The fourth Sunday of August was chosen as it fell near the feast day of Saint Julien, which is on 28 August. The large biblical figures in the procession also served the purpose of catechising a largely illiterate population.

In 2008, the Ducasse d'Ath was recognised as one of the Masterpieces of the Oral and Intangible Heritage of Humanity by UNESCO, as part of the bi-national inscription 'Processional giants and dragons in Belgium and France'. It was delisted in December 2022 following complaints about one of the characters that appears in the procession: a 'savage', depicted by a white person in blackface, wearing a nose ring and chains.

== Gallery ==
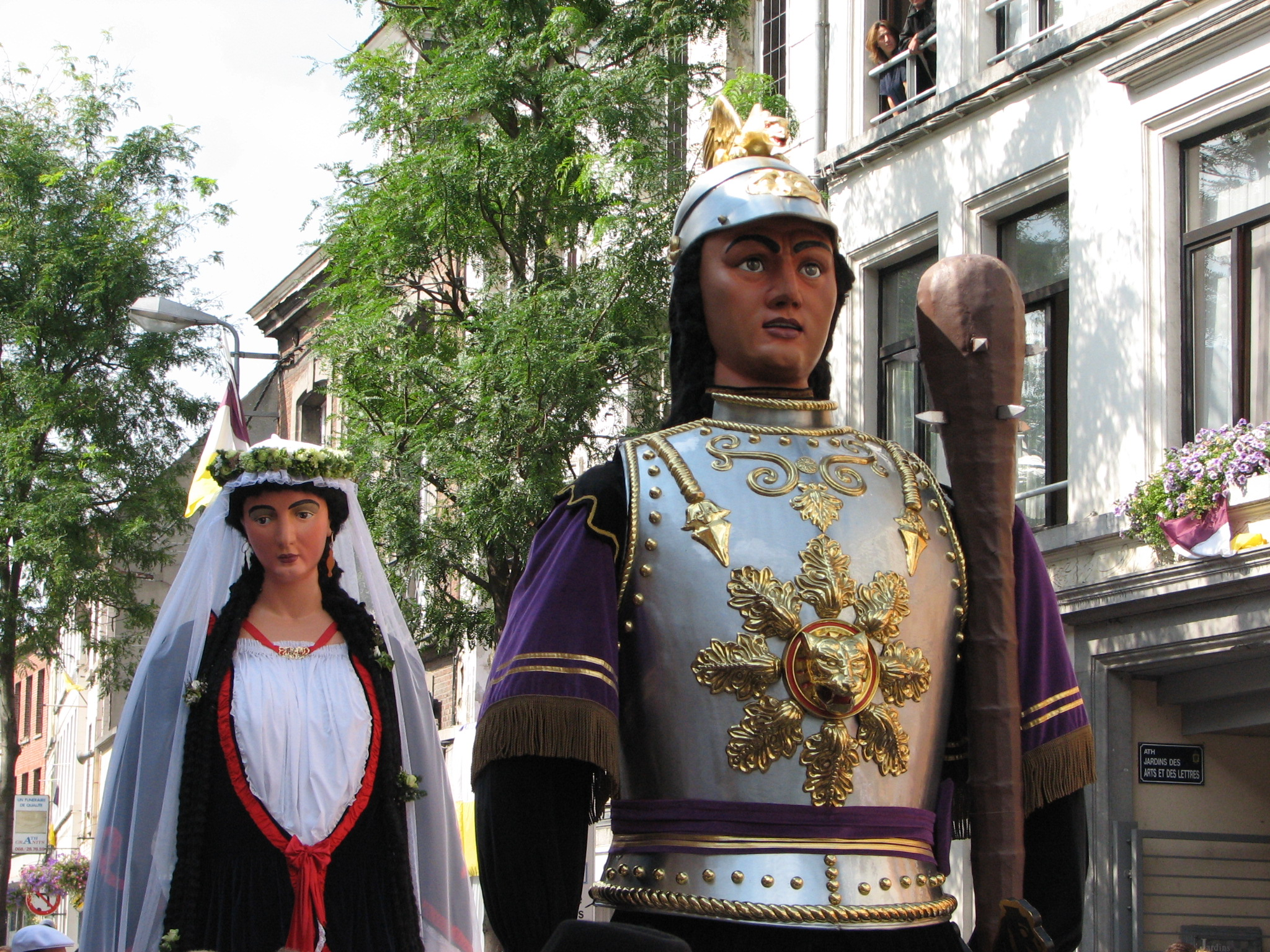
The giants Mr and Mrs Goliath

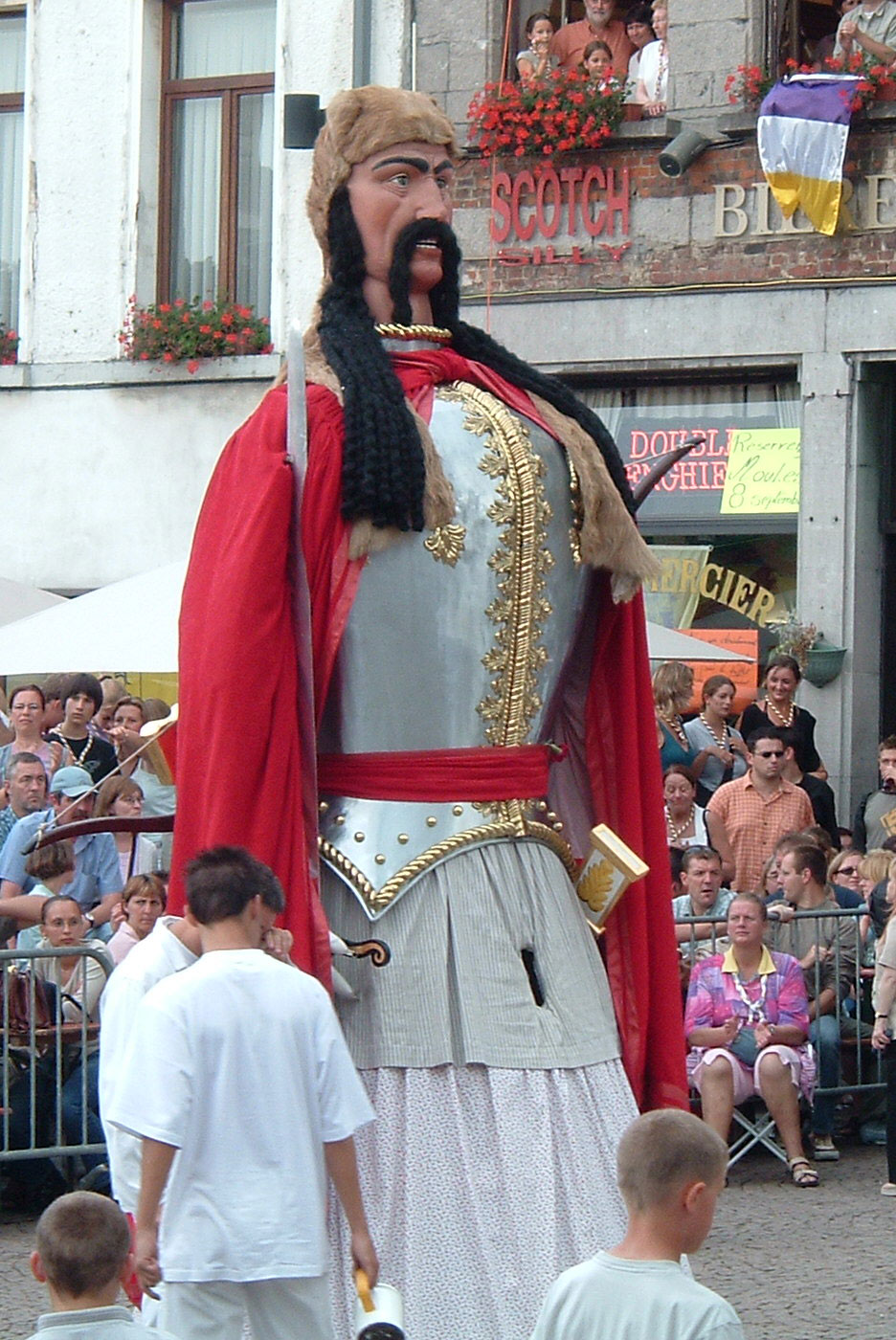
The giant Ambiorix

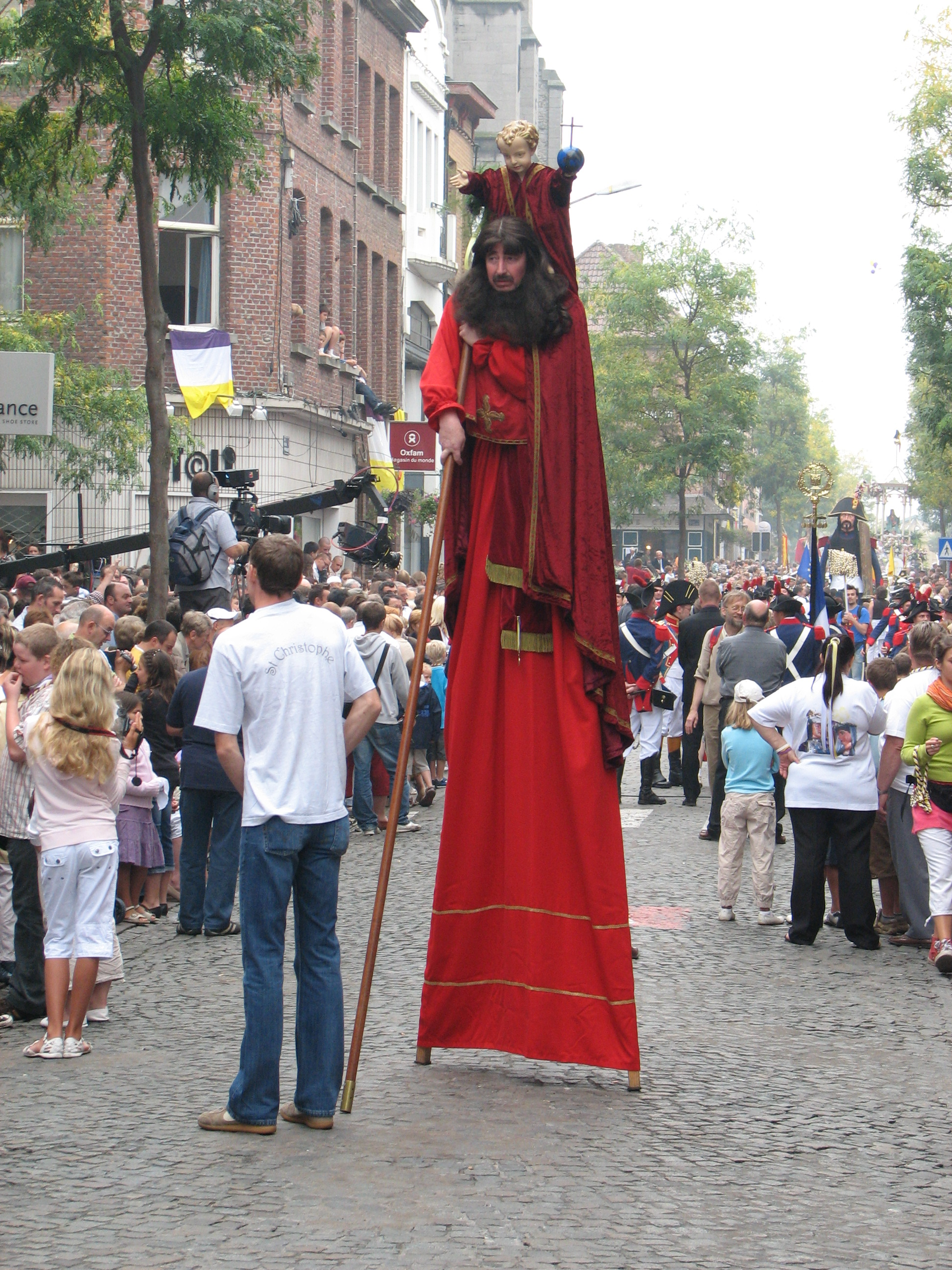
Saint Christopher of Flobecq

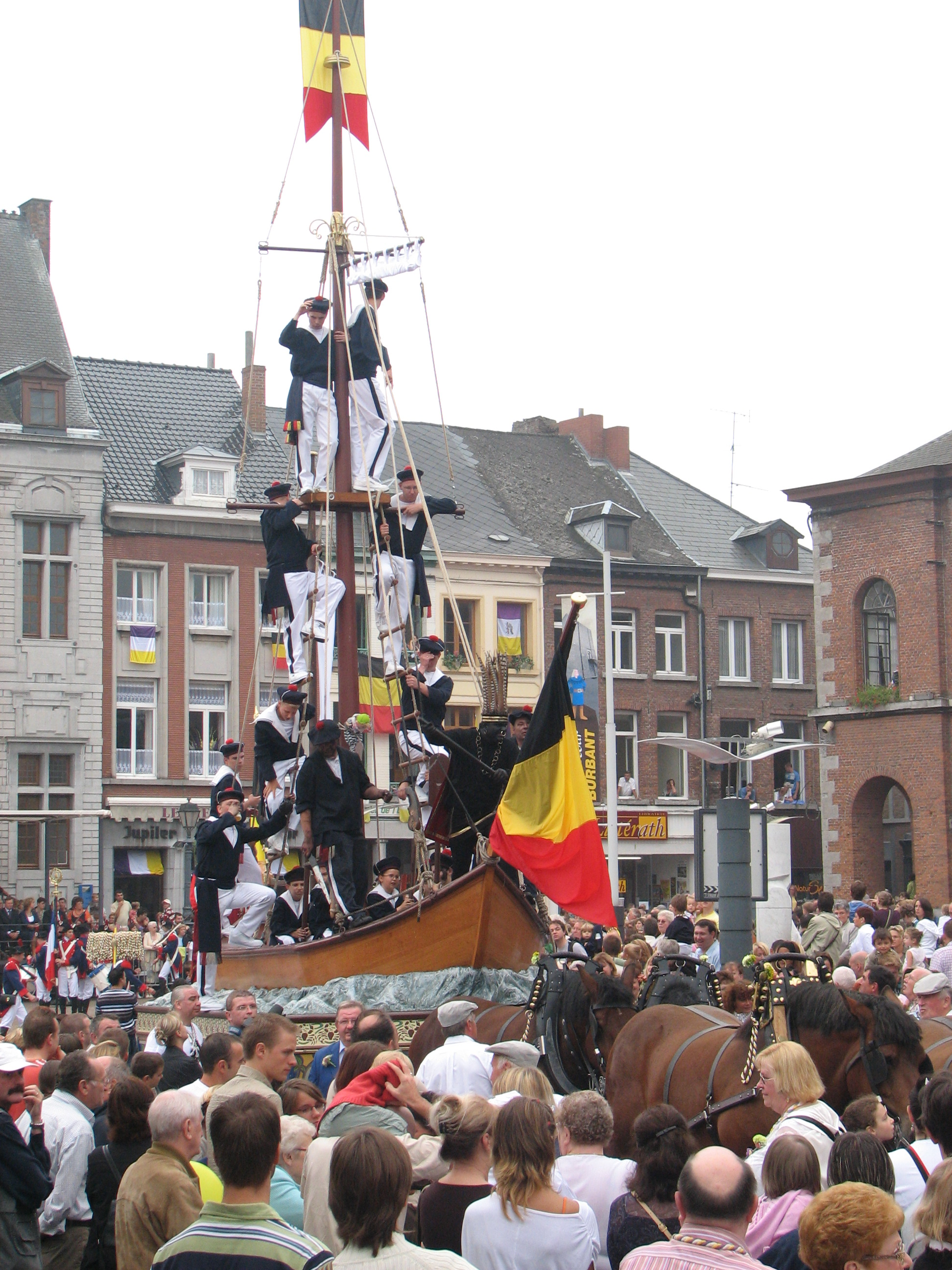
The Barque des pêcheurs napolitains

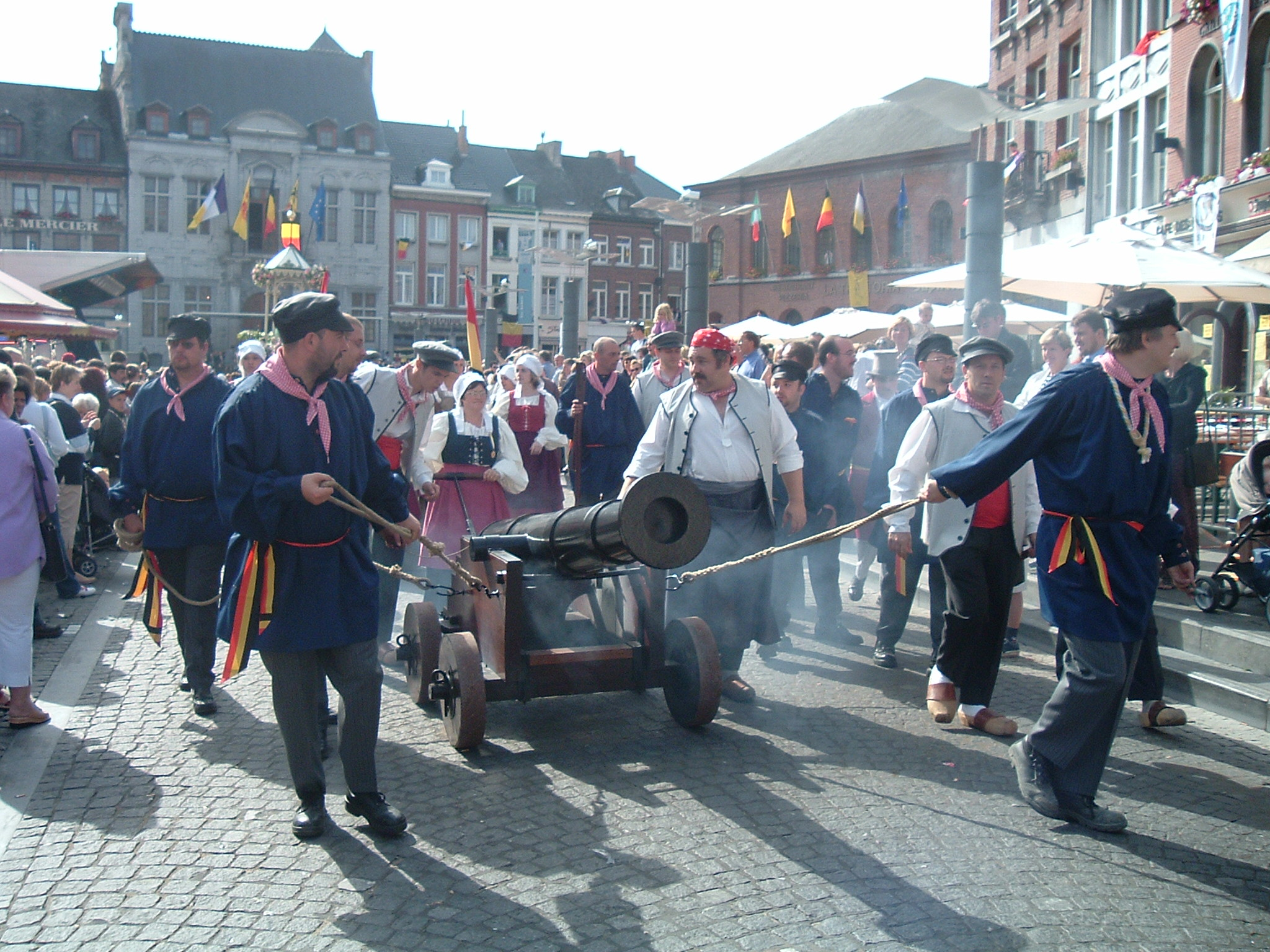
The Canon du Mont Sarah

== Bibliography ==
- Bowker, John (1999). The Oxford Dictionary of World Religions. New York: Oxford University Press. ISBN 0-19-866242-4.
- Goblet d'Alviella, Eugène (1908). Circumambulation in: Encyclopædia of Religion and Ethics. Vol. 3. Edinburgh: T. & T. Clark.
