= Ros Beiaard (Dendermonde) =

Belgian folkloristic horse

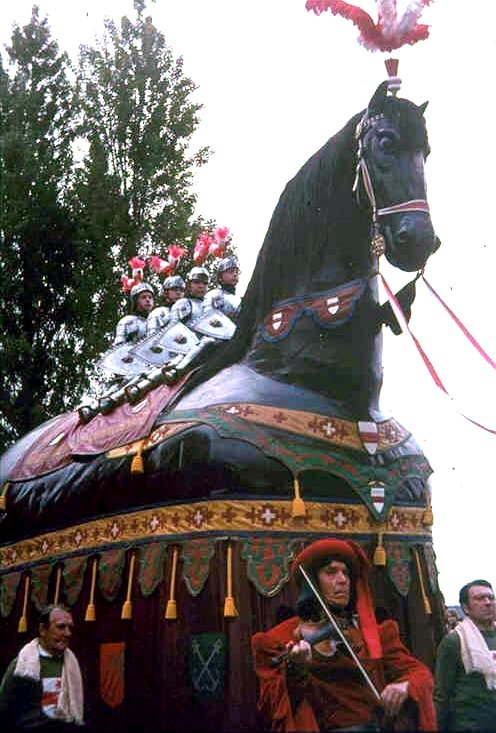
Ros Beiaardommegang 1975 with the brothers De Jonghe

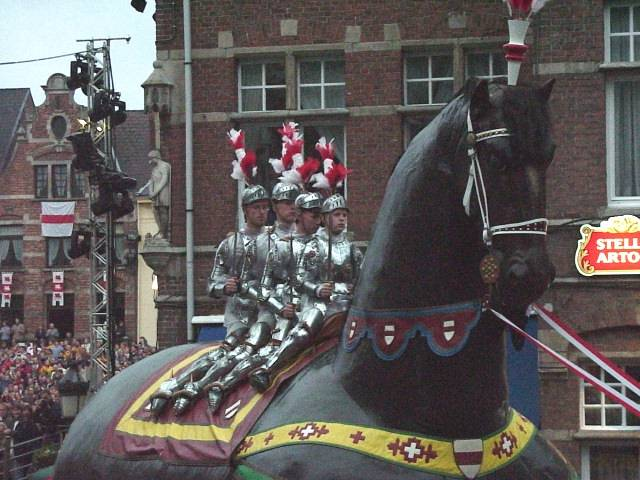
Ros Beiaardommegang 2000 with the brothers Coppieters

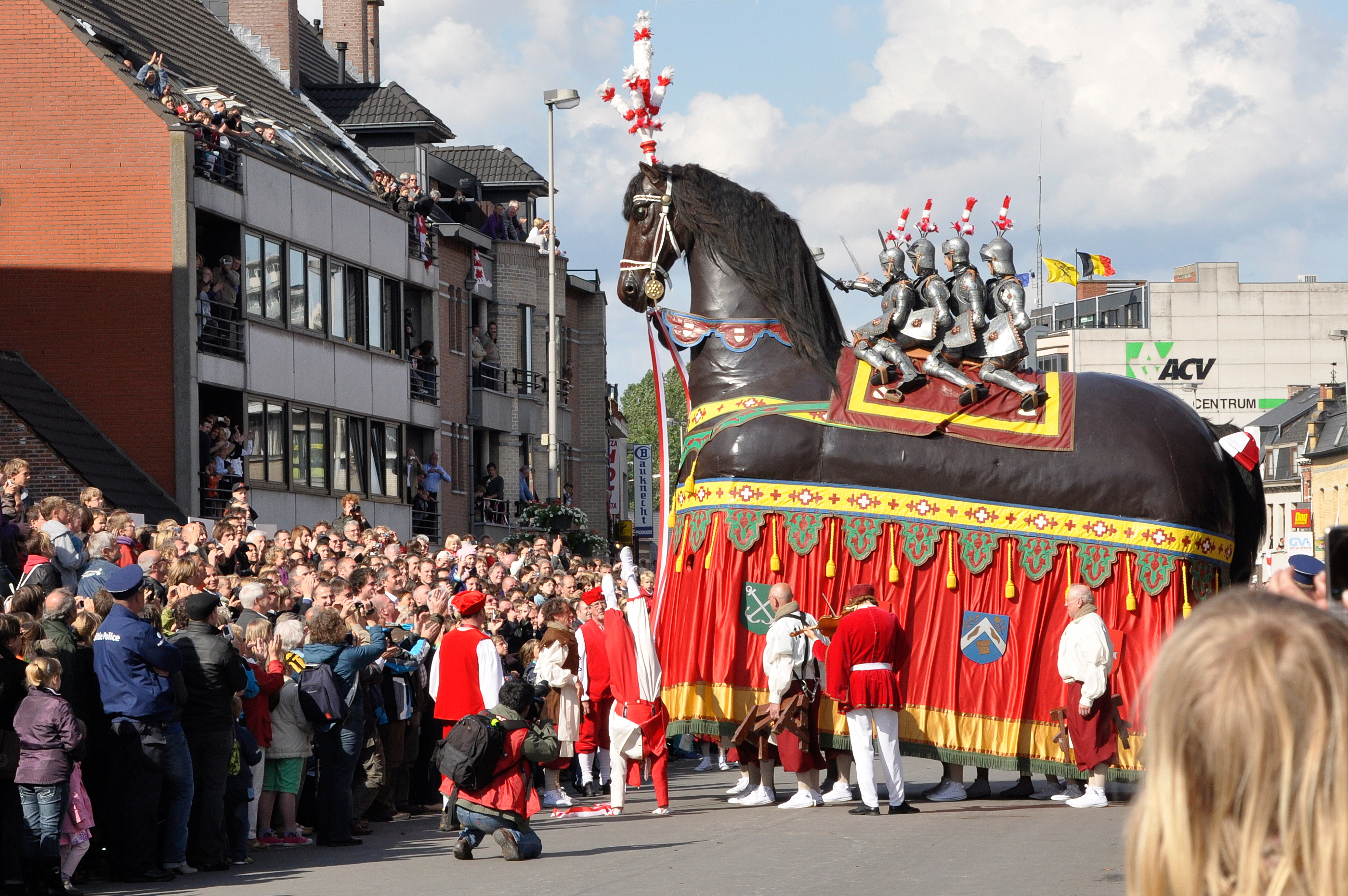
Ros Beiaardommegang 2010 with the brothers Van Damme

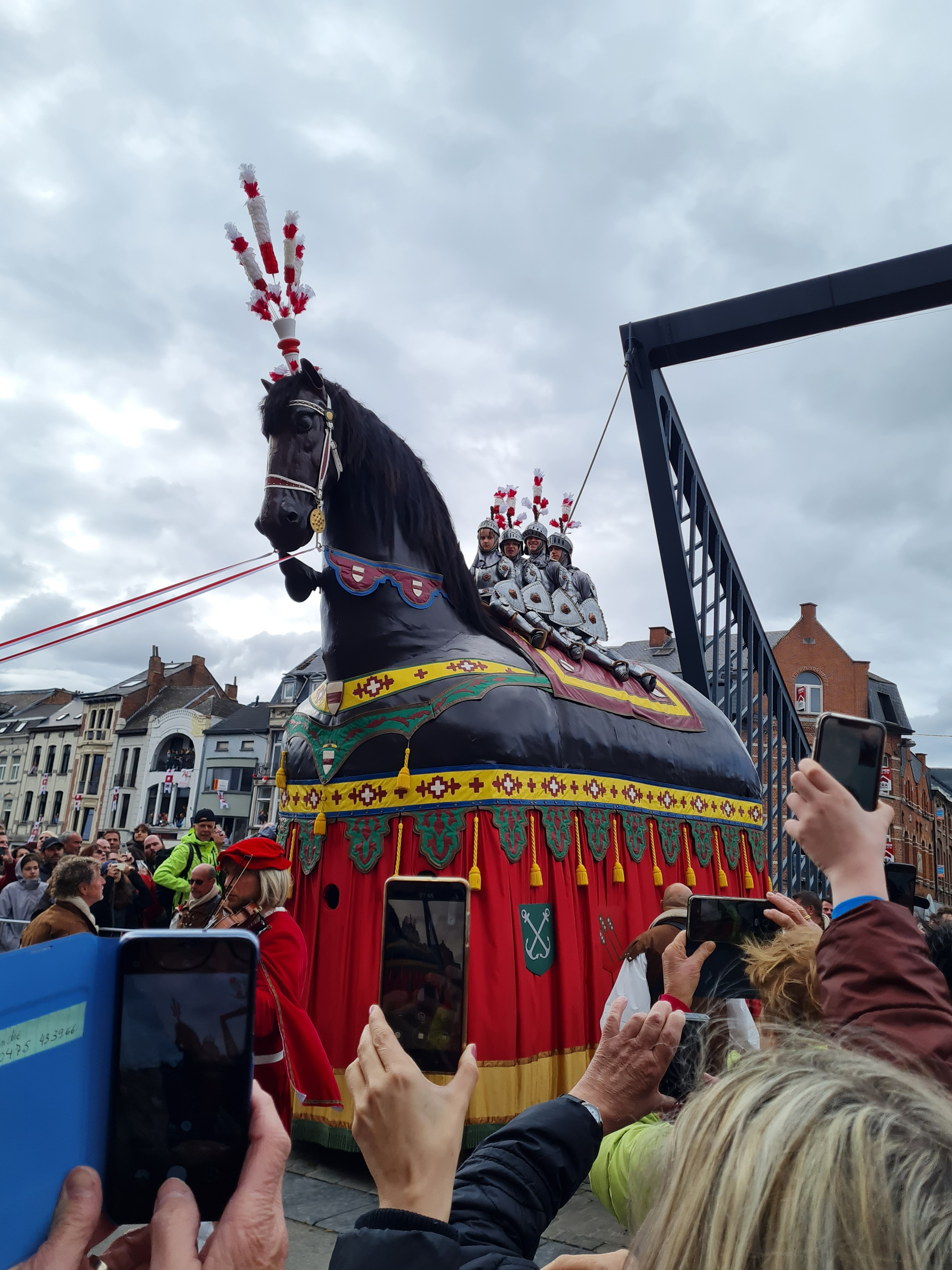
Ros Beiaardommegang 2022 with the brothers Cassiman

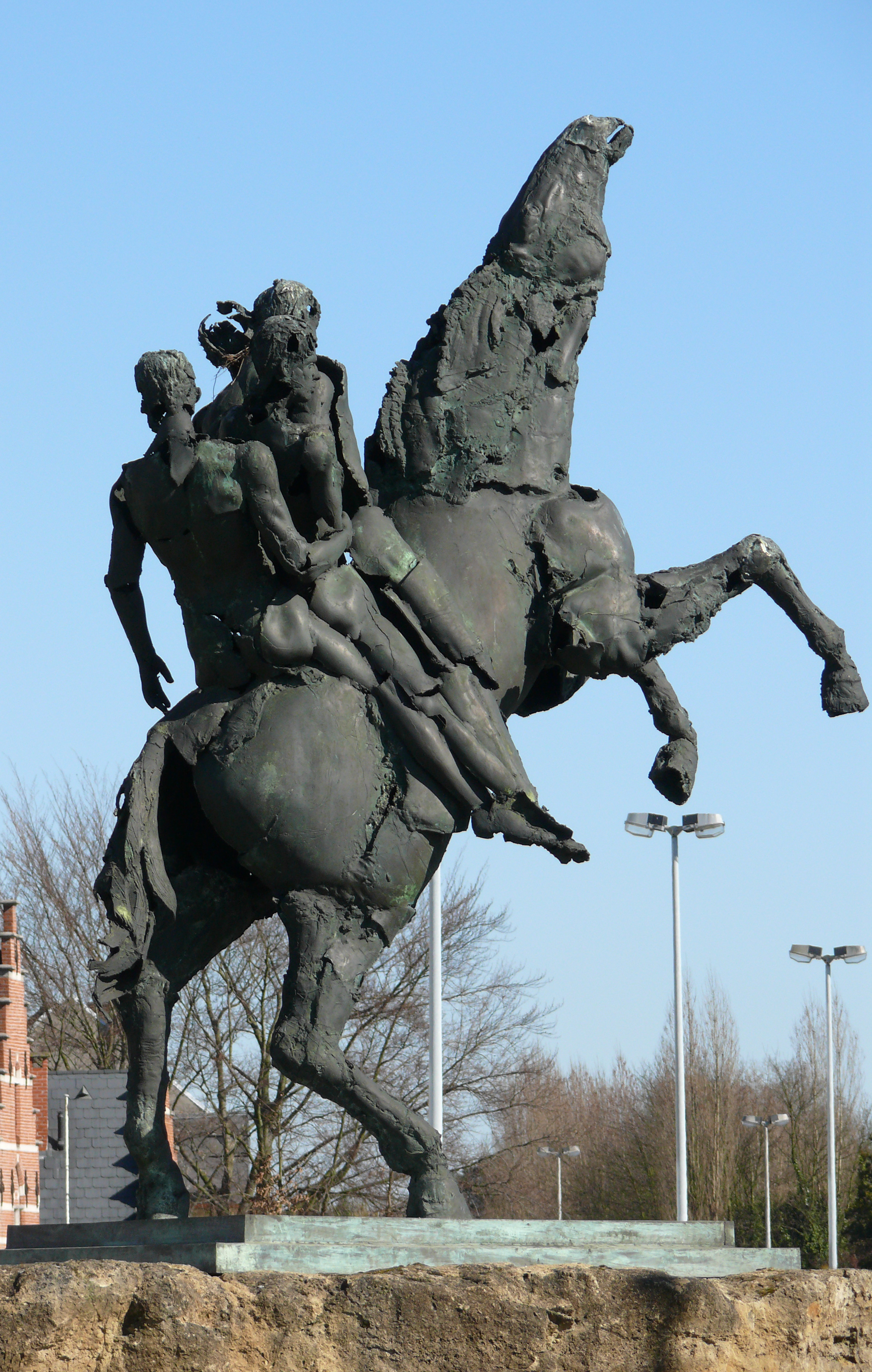
Statue of the Ros Beiaard

The Ros Beiaard of Dendermonde, Belgium, is a large folkloristic horse and the main character in the Ommegang van Dendermonde, a traditional folk festival held in that city. It is used only once every ten years and it is carried by members of a local guild, the Pijnders. Traditionally, four young brothers from Dendermonde ("de Vier Heemskinderen"; the Four Sons of Aymon) ride the horse in full armour.

Since 2008, the Ros Beiaard and the accompanying procession have been recognised as a Masterpiece of the Oral and Intangible Heritage of Humanity by UNESCO, as part of the bi-national inscription "Processional giants and dragons in Belgium and France".

== The legend of Ros Beiaard ==
- See: Ros Beiaard

== 't Peird van Dendermonde ==
The Ros Beiaard of Dendermonde is carried through the town every ten years by a guild of bearers, called the Pijnders. In keeping with the legend, four young brothers from Dendermonde (de Vier Heemskinderen) wearing full armour sit astride the horse. The legend of Ros Beiaard is acted out during the procession.

== Dimensions and weight ==
From the ground to the tallest part of the head, the Ros Beiaard is 4.85 m (15.9 ft) high. If the decorations on top are added, the horse is 5.8 m (19 ft) high. From nose to tail, the Ros is 5.2 m (17 ft) long and the width is exactly 2 m (6 ft 7 in). The head of the Ros Beiaard is made out of oak wood and it is 120 cm (47 in) long and 50 cm (20 in) wide. The horse weighs 800 kg (1,800 lb) without the brothers on top. The wooden frame has three spaces and has space for 12 bearers or Pijnders.

== The four 'Heemskinderen' ==
Every ten years, the selection of the four 'Heemskinderen' is difficult. The criteria are severe:

- It has to be four consecutive brothers, without a girl in between.
- They all have to be born in Dendermonde.
- The parents and grandparents have to be born in Dendermonde.
- They have to be between 7 and 21 years old on the day of the procession.
- They have to live in Dendermonde or one of its suburbs.

=== 19th century ===
In 1807, the Ros was ridden by Pieter-Emmanuel, Pieter-Frans, Pieter-Jan and Bernard-Jozef Blomme. The horse was used to celebrate the birthday of Napoleon I and the Concordate.

In 1850 the brothers were Edmond, Désiré, Henri and Lodewijk Spanogh. The procession celebrated the 50th anniversary of the Court and the Academy of Arts. The historian David Lindanus was also commemorated and king Leopold II attended the procession.

The inauguration of the statue of Pater De Smet in 1878 entailed a new procession and the knights were Isidoor, Omer, Petrus and Frans Willems. They also celebrated the inauguration of the new lock in the Dender.

When Polydore de Keyser, Lord Mayor of London, visited his birth town Dendermonde in 1888, the Heemskinderen were Henri, Lodewijk, Gustaaf and Alfons Pieters.

In 1899, the Ros Beiaard was ridden by Pieter, Adhemar, Lucinthe and Leo Dieltjens. They celebrated a new bridge over the Scheldt.

=== 20th century ===
In 1914, the knights were Jan, Leo, Pieter and Edward De Bruyn. The celebration was the appointment of Leo Bruynincx as mayor of Dendermonde.

In 1930, Dendermonde celebrated the centenary of the Belgian independence and the Horse was ridden by Henri, Jean, Pierre and Albert Van Damme.

In 1952, Jozef, Rafaël, Pieter and Jan Bombay were the knights. The town hall existed for 500 years and this was celebrated.

In 1958, because of the World's Fair in Brussels, the brothers Emiel, Albert, Jozef and Luc Leybaert rode the Ros.

In 1975 the brothers Dirk, Wim, Boudewijn and Kris De Jonghe rode the Horse.

In 1990 the honour befell the brothers Veldeman.

In 2000 the brothers Roy, Nick, Ken and Dean Coppieters rode the Ros.

=== 21st century ===
In 2010 the procession was held in May and the Van Damme brothers rode the horse.

In 2022 the brothers Marteen, Wout, Stan and Lander Cassiman rode the horse. The procession was originally scheduled to be held on May 24, 2020, but due to the COVID-19 pandemic it was postponed.

== The Pijnders ==
The guild of the Pijnders originated in the 14th century and had the monopoly on loading and unloading ships and cellars with wine and beer. Today, the Pijnders are the only persons allowed to carry the Ros Beiaard in the processions.

The task of the Pijnders must not be underestimated, as they occupy a main function in the procession in carrying the horse. The movements of the horse have to be synchronized with the directions of the director. The Pijnders are divided into three groups consisting each of twelve carriers. Every group has its leader who has to set the pace and order the special movements.

== The Hymn ==
The legend is told in the city hymn of Dendermonde. The hymn also refers to the rivalry with the neighbor city of Aalst who purportedly envy the Dendermonde for its horse.

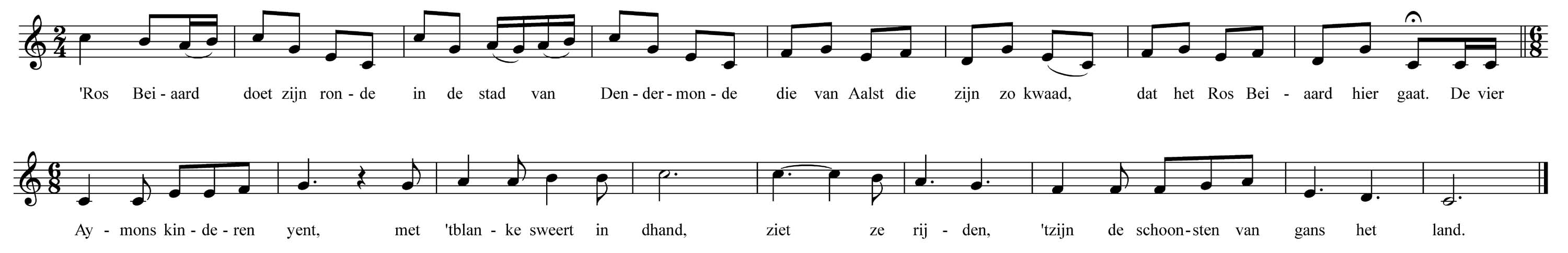
The Ros Beiaard hymn

't Ros Beiaard doet zijn ronde In de stad van Dendermonde; Die van Aalst die zijn zo kwaad omdat hier 't Ros Beiaard gaat. refrein: De vier Aymons kinderen jent Met blanke zweerd in d'hand Ziet ze rijden 't Zijn de schoonsten van ons land	't Ros Beiaards ogen fonk'len Zijne brede manen kronk'len En hij wendt hem fraai en vlug Met vier broers op zijnen rug. Hun harnas, schild en lansen blinken bij de zonneglanzen En den beiaard 't voisken geeft daar het Ros zijn eer in heeft.	O Dendermondenaren; Blijft altijd den roem bewaren Van het peerd zo wijd vermaard Als den grootsten man op aard. 't Ros Beiaard is ons glorie en benijdt g' ons die victorie Aelst, gij hebt nog min verstand als ons ridder ros vaillant.	't Ros Beiaard is verheven heeft zich in het vuur begeven en het week op 't oorlogsveld alles voor zijn groot geweld.

== See also ==
- List of fictional horses
