= El Progrés, Badalona =

Coordinates: 41°26′39″N 2°14′20″E

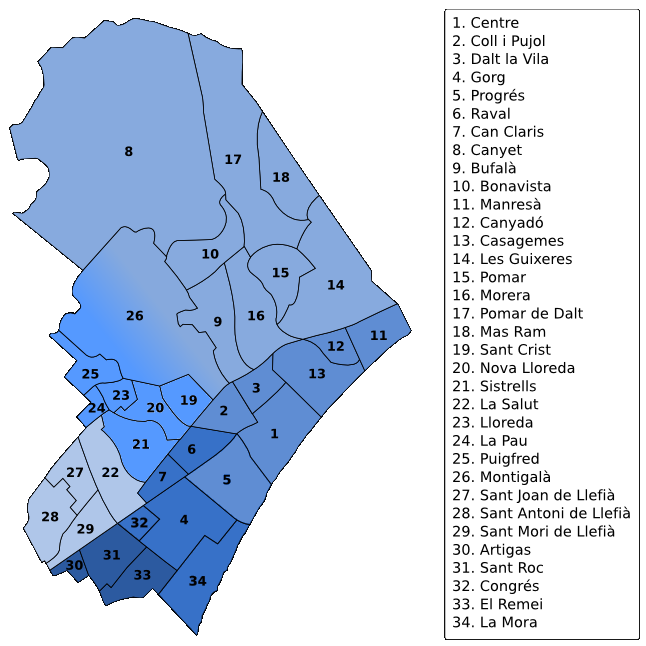
Administrative subdivisions of Badalona.

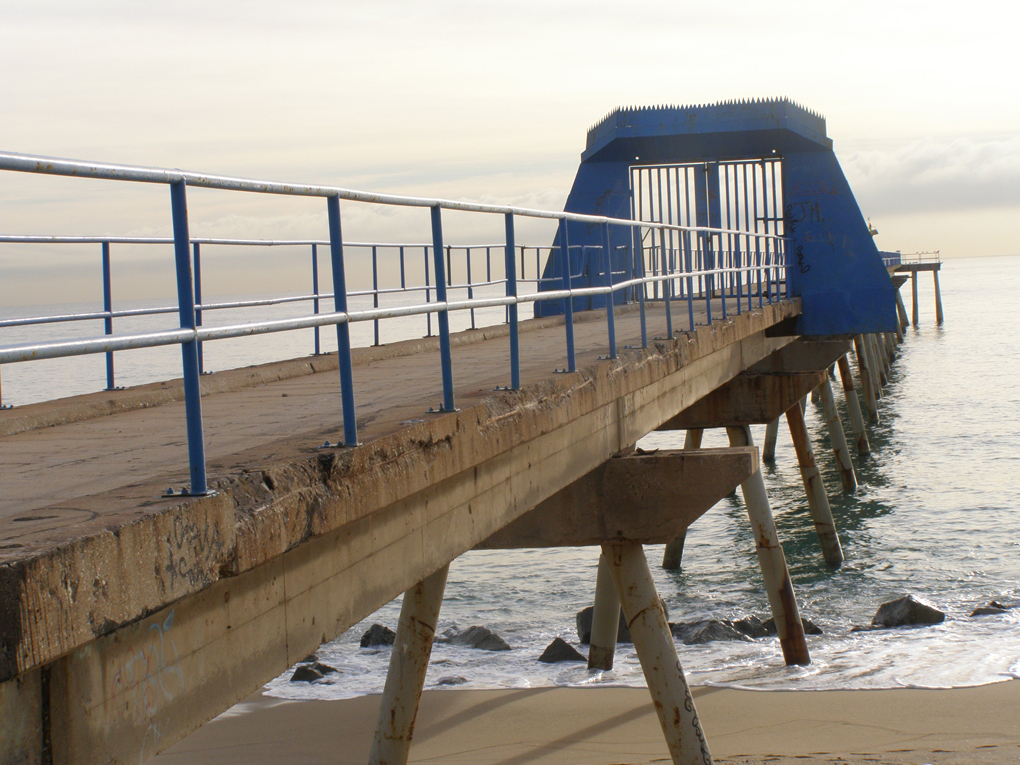
Pont del Petroli.

El Progrés is a coastal area of Badalona (Barcelonès, Catalonia, Spain) in the town's District 1, and as such, part of the metropolitan area of Barcelona. It is bordered by Gorg, La Mora, Raval, Can Claris, Centre and the Mediterranean Sea. As of the 2012 census El Progrés had 11,059 inhabitants, or 5% of Badalona's population. Like many toponyms in the town (such as Unió, Conquista, Indústria) the name of this neighbourhood —which is Catalan for "The Progress"— evokes the industrial age which was the time of its inception.

The area is home to the famous Anís del Mono factory, in Avinguda Eduard Maristany. It was built by the brothers Bosch and Grau in 1868, and it is close to both the rail tracks the Pont del Petroli beach. Platja del Coco is another beach within administrative limits of the area. The former CACI factory will host the forthcoming Museu del Còmic i la Il·lustració de Catalunya, currently under construction.

== Transport ==
The closest rail transport link is the metro station Pep Ventura, on Barcelona Metro line L2.
