= Joan Amigó =

Spanish architect

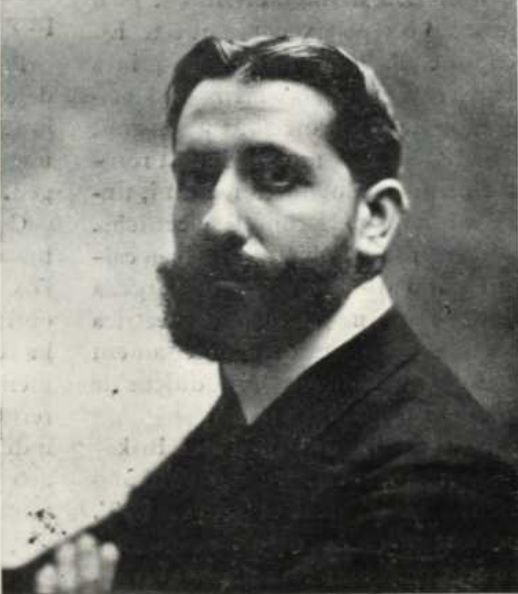
Picture of Joan Amigó by the Napoleon photographers published in 1907 on La Ilustració Catalana

Joan Amigó i Barriga (1875–1958) was a Spanish architect, a late representative of the modernism and the most important of this style in Badalona.

== Life ==
He was born in Badalona on 27 January 1875, son of Francesca Barriga i Torner and Ramon Amigó i Umbert, a chocolatier. The origins of the family are in Canyet, a farmer neighbourhood on the mountain. Soon after his birth, his father died and his mother married again with Jaume Botey i Garriga, a general contractor who influenced Amigó to study architecture and with whom he had his first contact with construction and other related tasks.

First he studied in Liceu Políglota of Barcelona and then architecture in the Architecture High Technique School in the same city and obtained the degree in 1900. Most of their buildings are located in Badalona, where from 1914 to 1924 was municipal architect. Appointed as a member of the construction council of Sant Josep parish, he was the architect of the church for many years. He died in Badalona on 30 December 1958.

== Style ==
Amigó is part of the second modernist generation, later than Gaudí, Domènech i Montaner or Puig i Cadafalch. Belong to the same college promotion the architect Antoni de Falguera, and the next was that of Salvador Valeri and Alexandre Soler. This generation lived the modernism as a more established trend that did not represent anymore a break with tradition, on the contrary modernism became a tradition.

He is a follower of the modernism, but also receives the news from Europe with influences of the Vienna Secession and even the Glasgow School. These new trends are present in houses Enric Pavillard (1906), Serra Vinyas (1907) and Enric Mir (1908). The last is the most influenced by the Secession and even by Mackintosh. His works include also some factories like Gottardo de Andreis or Can Casacuberta with influences of Wagner, Mackintosh and Olbrich.

Many of his works are signed by his stepfather Jaume Botey because he could not sign private works when he was municipal architect.

== Works ==
=== Badalona ===
Year	Name	Location	Picture	Ref.
1902	Casa Matamala	C. Santa Madrona, 28	Casa Matamala	
1903	Escola Germans Maristes	C. Temple, 15-19	Escola Germans Maristes	
1904	Tomb of Francesc d'A. Guixeras	Old Cemetery	Tomb of Francesc d'A. Guixeras	
1905	Casa Andreu Clarós	C. Pietat, 12	Casa Andreu Clarós	
1905	Casa Pau Rodon	C. Museu, 18	Casa Pau Rodon	
1906	Casa Enric Pavillard	Av. Martí Pujol, 23	Casa Enric Pavillard	
1906/1909	Gottardo de Andreis Factory	C. Indústria, 89	Factory Gottardo de Andreis	
1906/1919	Anís del Mono Distillery	C. Eduard Maristany, 115	Distillery of Anís del Mono	
1907	Casa Miquel Badia	C. Sant Pere, 4	Casa Miquel Badia	
1907	Casa Serra Vinyas (disappeared)	C. Enric Borràs, 7		
1907	Tomb of Bosch family	Old Cemetery	Tomb of Bosch family	
1907/1920	Can Casacuberta Factory	C. Dos de Maig, 27	Factory Can Casacuberta	
1908	Casa Leonard Le Prévost	Av. Martí Pujol, 37-39	Casa Leonard Le Prévost	
1908-09	Casa Enric Mir	Av. Martí Pujol, 45-47	Casa Enric Mir	
1908	Casa Lluís Paquín	C. Enric Borràs, 27	Casa Lluís Paquín	
1909	Casa i taller Joan Tolrà	C. Enric Borràs, 19-25	Casa i taller Joan Tolrà	
1912	Casa Pere Busquets	C. Temple, 25	Casa Pere Busquets	
1913	Creu de Montigalà	Turó de Montigalà	Creu de Montigalà	
1916	Casa Jaume Botey	C. Gaietà Soler, 1	Casa Jaume Botey	
1917	Casa Domènech Planas	Av. Martí Pujol, 188	Casa Domènech Planas	
1920	Church of Sant Josep	Pl. Rector Rifé	Church of Sant Josep	
1921-23	Casa Rafael Gafarel·lo	C. Enric Borràs, 18	Casa Rafael Gafarel·lo	
1922	Fountain of Pau Casals Square	Pl. Pau Casals	Fountain of Pau Casals Square	
1923	Casa Prat Bosch	C. Mar, 15	Casa Prat Bosch	
1923–24	Casa Antoni Lleal	C. Francesc Macià, 104	Casa Antoni Lleal	
1924	Casa Fèlix Gallent	C. Temple, 27	Casa Fèlix Gallent	
1924	Drogueria Boter	C. Mar, 71	Drogueria Boter	
1924	Farmàcia Serentill	C. Mar, 23	Farmàcia Serentill	
1930	Farmàcia Surroca	C. Mar, 76	Farmàcia Surroca	

=== Other locations ===
Year	Name	Location	Picture	Ref.
1907	Can Vicent Bosch (attribution)	C. Camprodon, 59. Arbúcies	Can Bosch	
1914	Ca l'Arnau	C. Bellaire, 2. Malgrat de Mar	Ca l'Arnau	
1920	Tomb of Vidal Xaus family	Cami de l'Alegria. Tiana		

== Bibliography ==
- Bohigas, Oriol (1966). "Joan Amigó Barriga. Otro modernista desconocido". Cuadernos de Arquitectura (in Spanish). 63: 45–48.
- Solé, Pepa (1990). "Joan Amigó i l'arquitectura modernista a Badalona". Carrer dels Arbres: Revista anuari del Museu de Badalona (in Catalan). 3 (1): 11–20.
- Soler i Amigó, Joan (2008). "En el cinquantenari de la mort de l'arquitecte Amigó. L'avi Joan". Carrer dels Arbres: Revista anuari del Museu de Badalona (in Catalan). 3 (19): 33–44.
