= Mettekoe =

Folklore giant

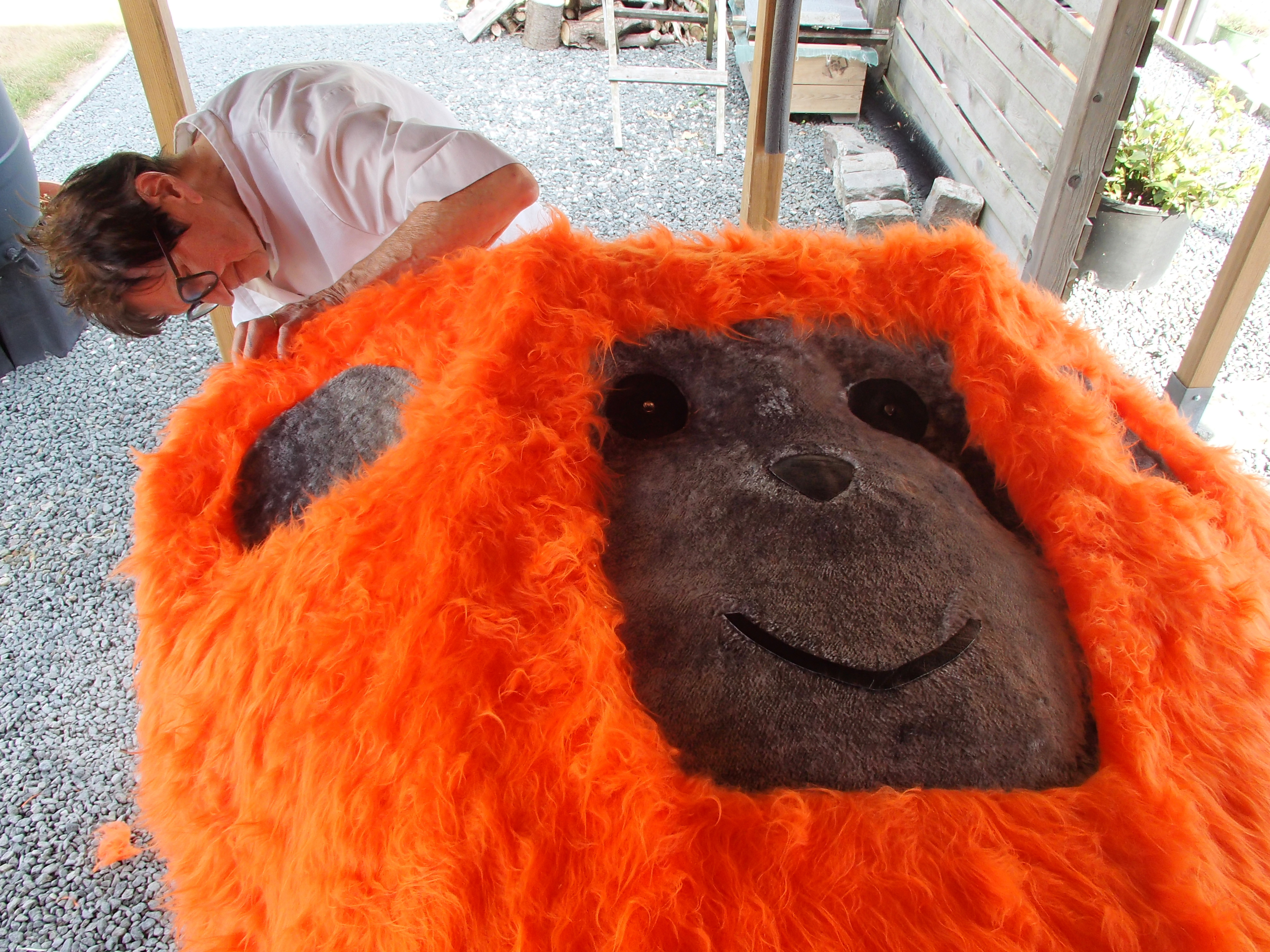
Manufacturing Mettekoe's head in 2022

Mettekoe is a folklore giant built in Petit-Enghien, Belgium, on August 23, 2022, and introduced to the public on September 18 of the same year.... 'Mettekoe' translates to 'monkey' in the Enghiennois dialect.

Mettekoe serves as the mascot of the charitable association 'Les Amis de Mettekoe' whose purpose is to raise funds to assist the orangutans of Borneo and Sumatra. Gathered around their giant, these volunteers regularly organize events such as gatherings of giants, concerts, and other charitable activities

Mettekoe aims to draw attention to the protection of orangutans and humanity's ability to rectify the harm it can cause to its environment

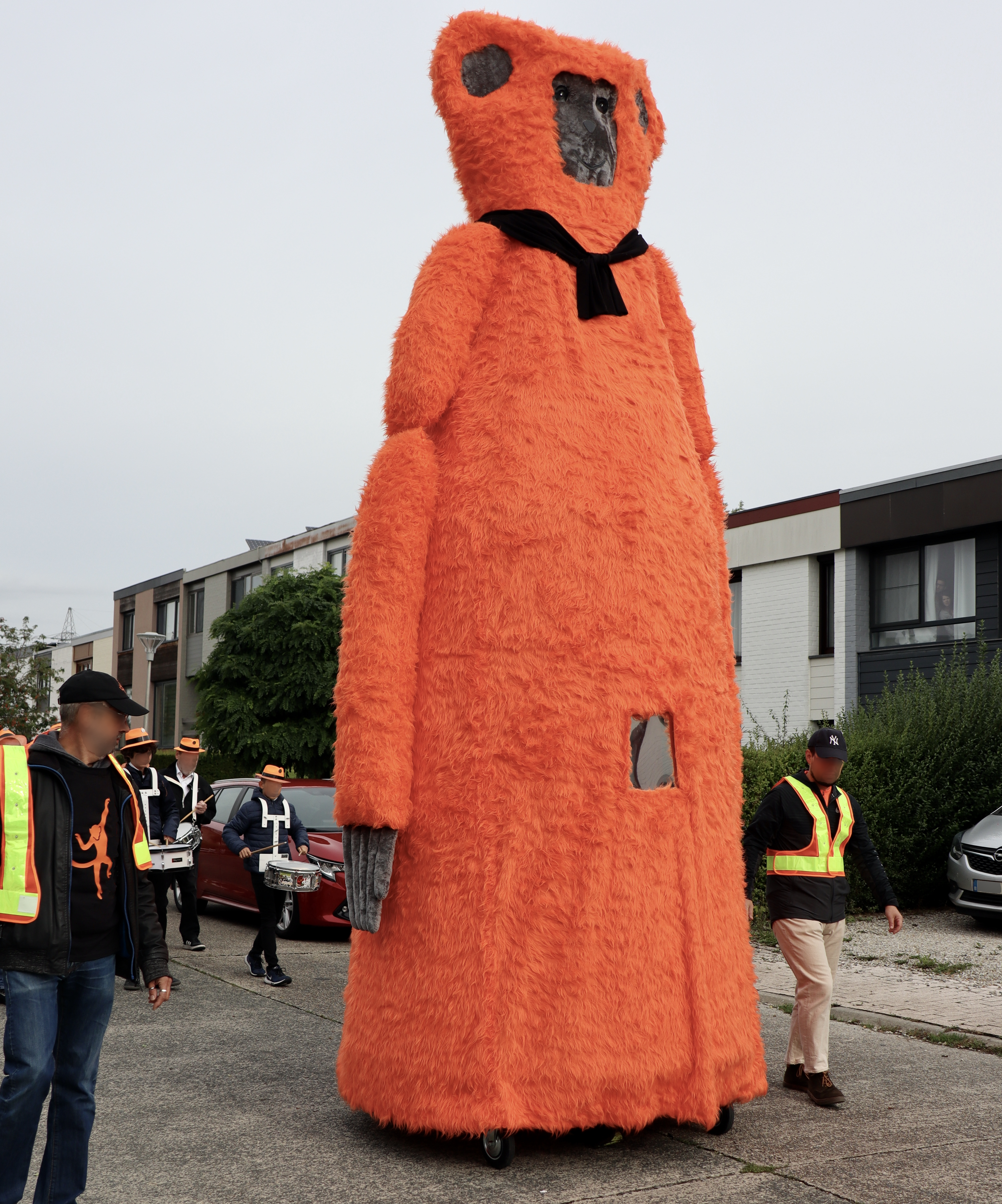
Mettekoe's first tour in 2022

During the spring of 2023, Mettekoe was spotted by the Petticoat Government collective during one of its outings and was invited to represent Belgium, along with a few other giants, at the International Contemporary Art Exhibition of the Venice Biennale in 2024

== See also ==
- Processional giant
