= Processional giant =

Costumed figures in European folklore

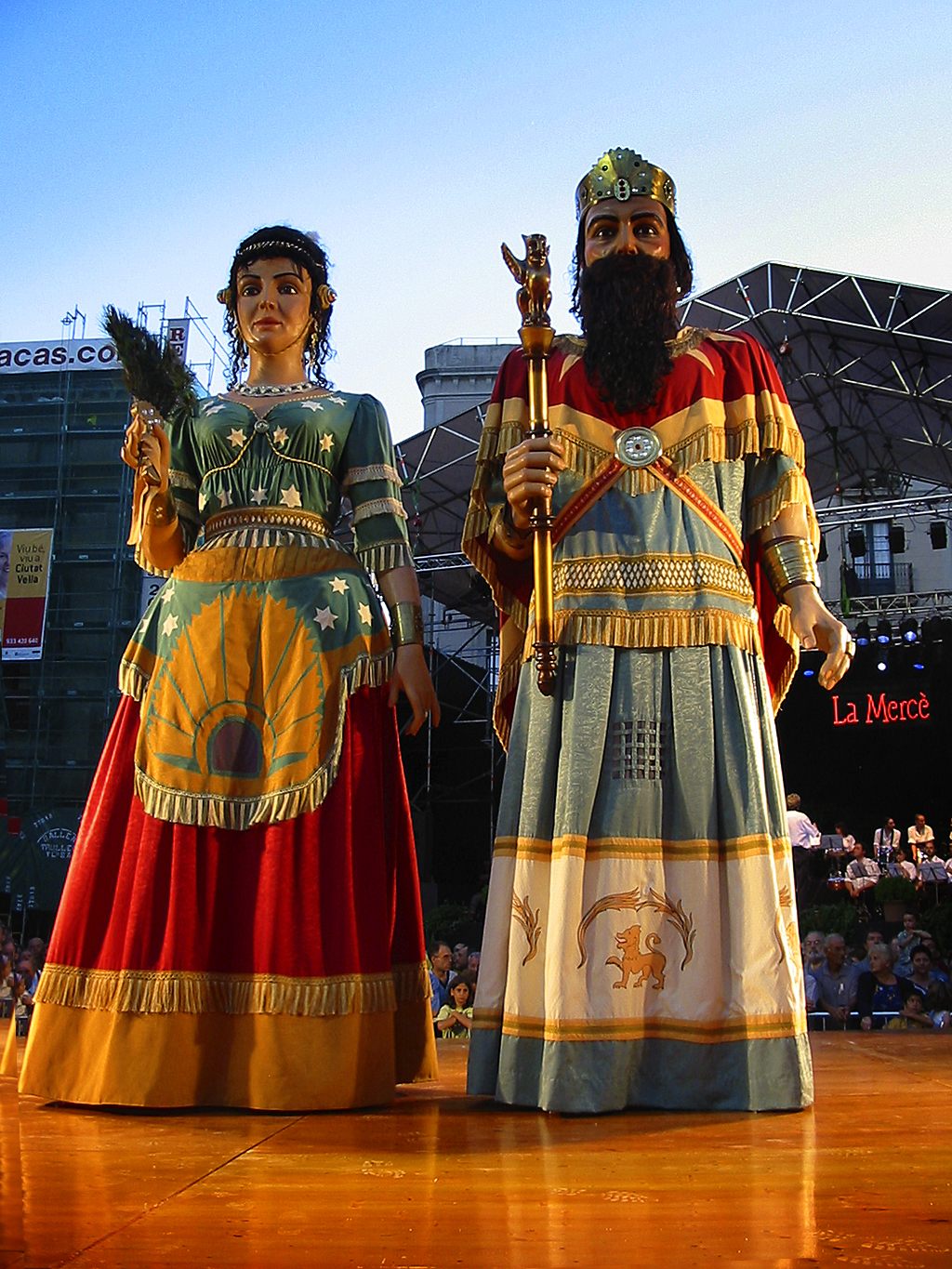
- Processional giants (Catalan: Gegants) in the feast of La Mercè, in Barcelona
- Material: Lightweight materials such as papier maché
- Present location: Europe and Latin America

Processional giants (Note: Dutch: stadsreuzen; French: géants processionnels; Spanish: gigantes y cabezudos; Valencian: gegants i cabuts; Catalan: gegants i capgrossos; Basque: erraldoi eta buruhandiak.) are costumed figures in European folklore, particularly present in Belgian, French, Portuguese, Spanish, Italian and English folkloric processions. The main feature of these figures is typically their wooden, papier maché or—more recently—synthetic resin head, whilst bodies are covered in clothing matching the costume's theme.

Several such processions are recognised by UNESCO as forms of intangible cultural heritage, including Belgian and French processional giants listed as Masterpiece of the Oral and Intangible Heritage of Humanity (as part of the binational listing of 'Processional giants and dragons in Belgium and France') or Spain's Catalonia region Patum de Berga.

== Background ==
The processional giant is a gigantic costumed figure that represents a fictitious or real being. Inherited from medieval rites, tradition has it that it is carried, and that it dances in the streets during processions or festivals. Its physiognomy and size are variable, and its name-giving varies according to the regions; among the Flemings, it is known by the name of reus (plural: reuzen), among the Picards it is called gayant. The large biblical figures in the procession also served the purpose of catechising a largely illiterate population.

The first registered date for the gigantones e cabeçudos is the Corpus Christi procession in Évora, Portugal, back in 1265. It included the snake, the demon and the dragon which represented the challenges that Jesus Christ had to defeat. In Spain, the first written references in novels date from 1276 in Pamplona (Navarra) with three giants representing three people from Pamplona: Pero-Suciales (woodcutter), Mari-Suciales (villager) and Jucef-Lacurari (Jew).

== Regional traditions ==
=== Belgium ===
Belgium has nearly 1500 giants on its soil. Their appearance dates back to the 15th century; Goliath of Nivelles, which is mentioned as early as 1457, is the oldest known Belgian giant. Belgium also has the largest giant in Europe; Jean Turpin of Nieuwpoort, which is 10.4 metres (34 ft).

The Belgian cultural heritage includes the following events:

- Ducasse d'Ath
- Ducasse de Mons
- Meyboom of Brussels
- Ommegang van Appels
- Ommegang van Dendermonde
- Ommegang van Lier
- Ommegang van Mechelen
- Reuzenstoet of Borgerhout
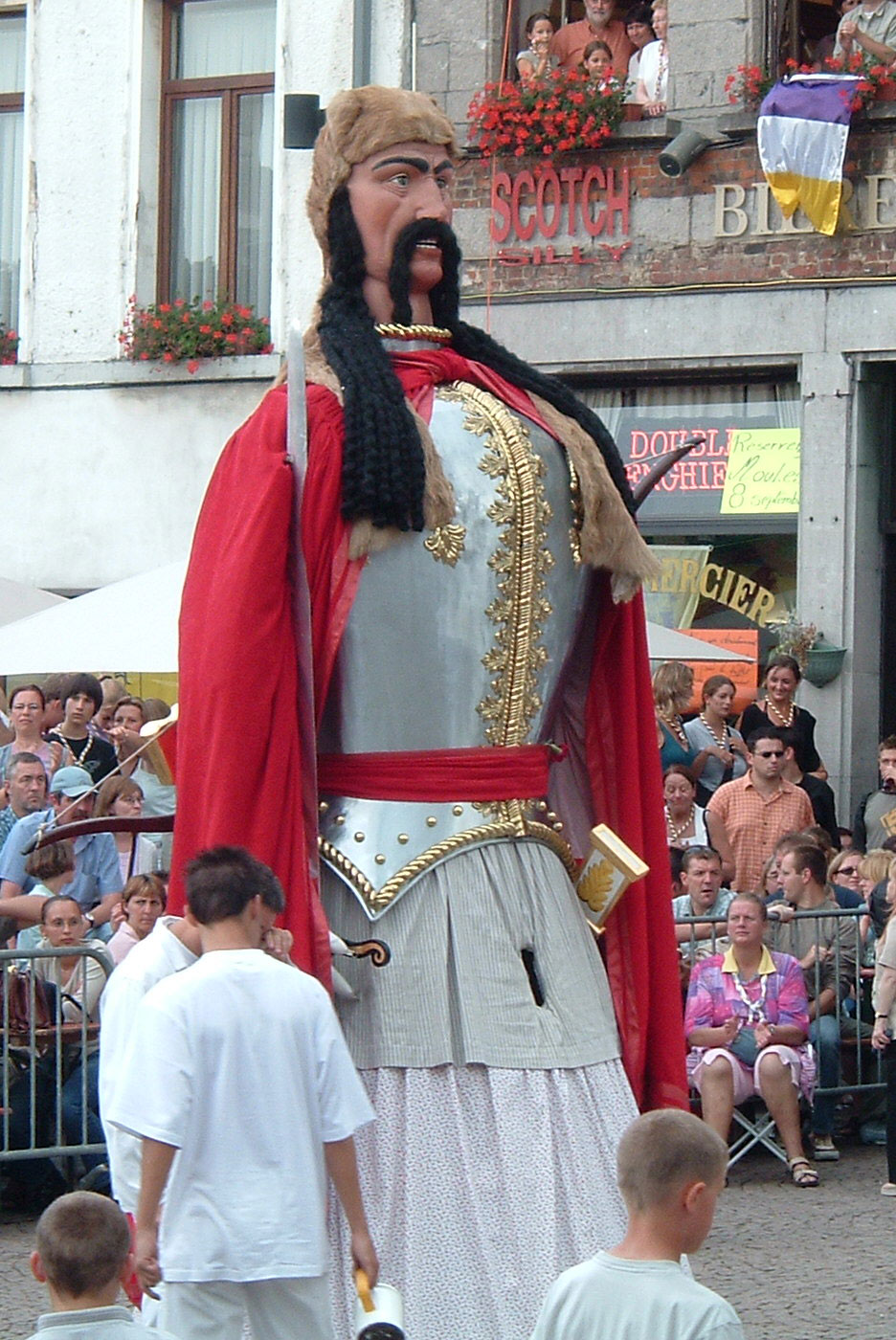
The giant Ambiorix at the Ducasse d'Ath, Belgium

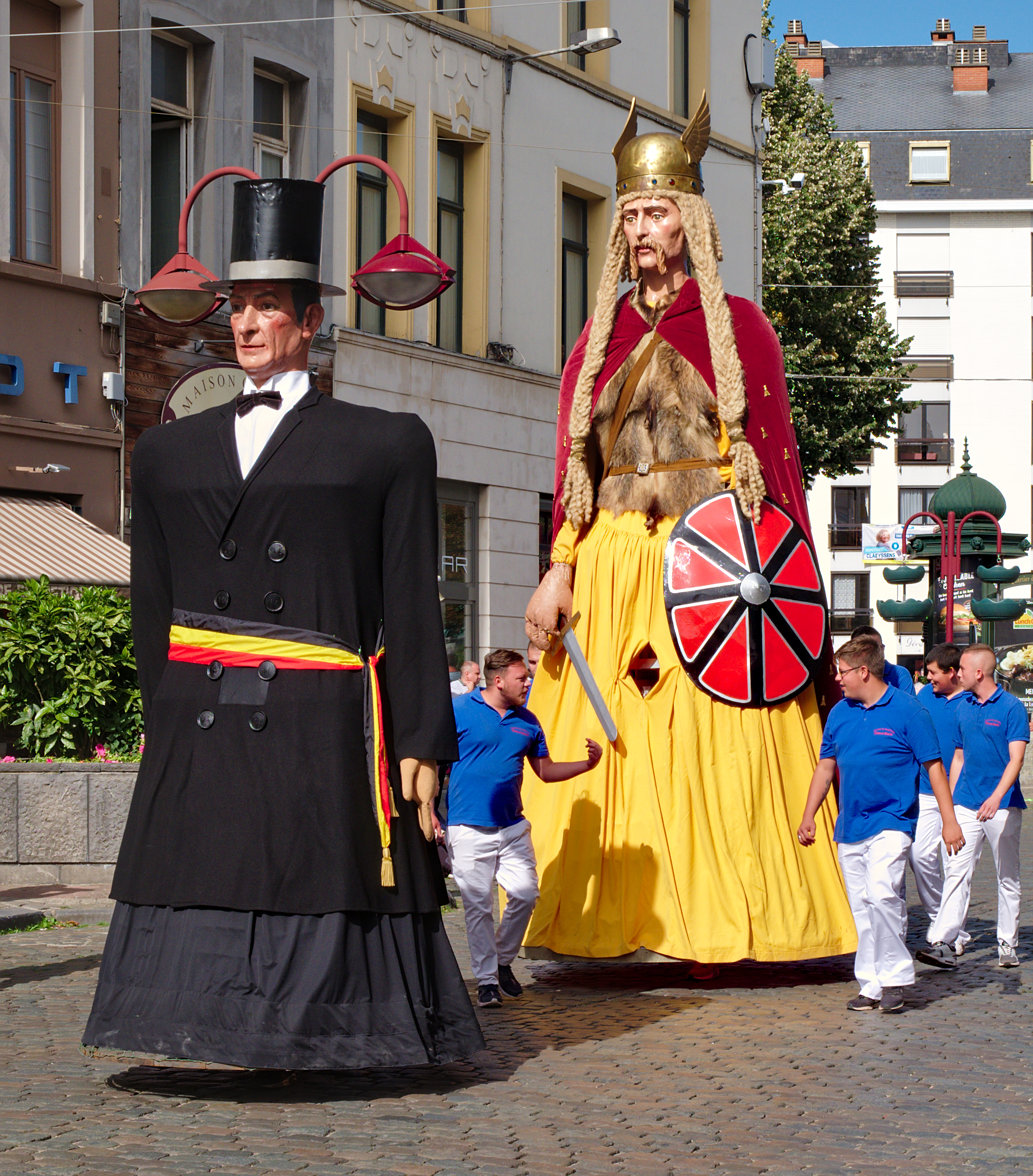
Giants of Tournai, Belgium

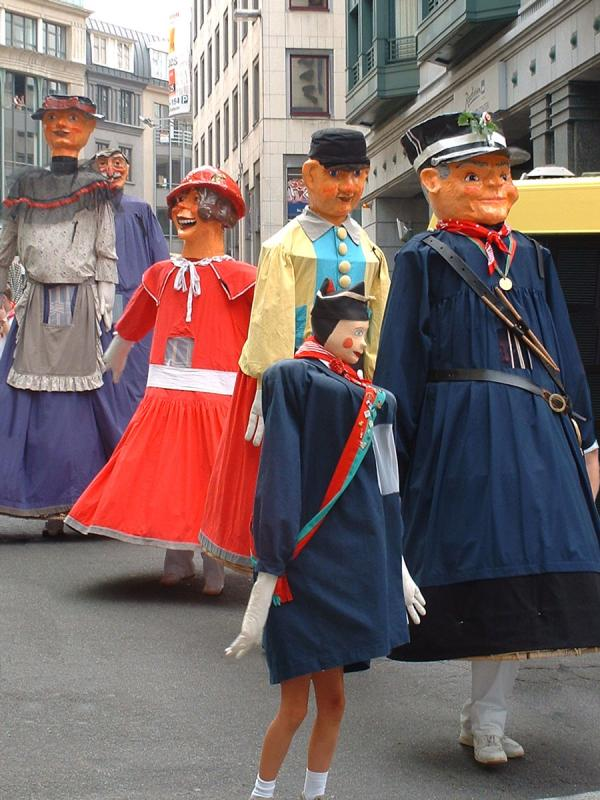
Giants of the Meyboom of Brussels

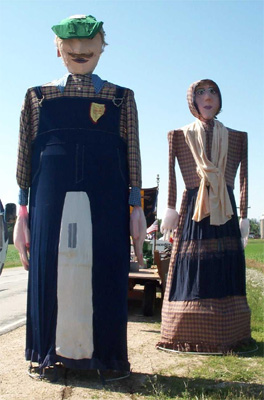
Giants of Belgian American community in Brussels, Wisconsin

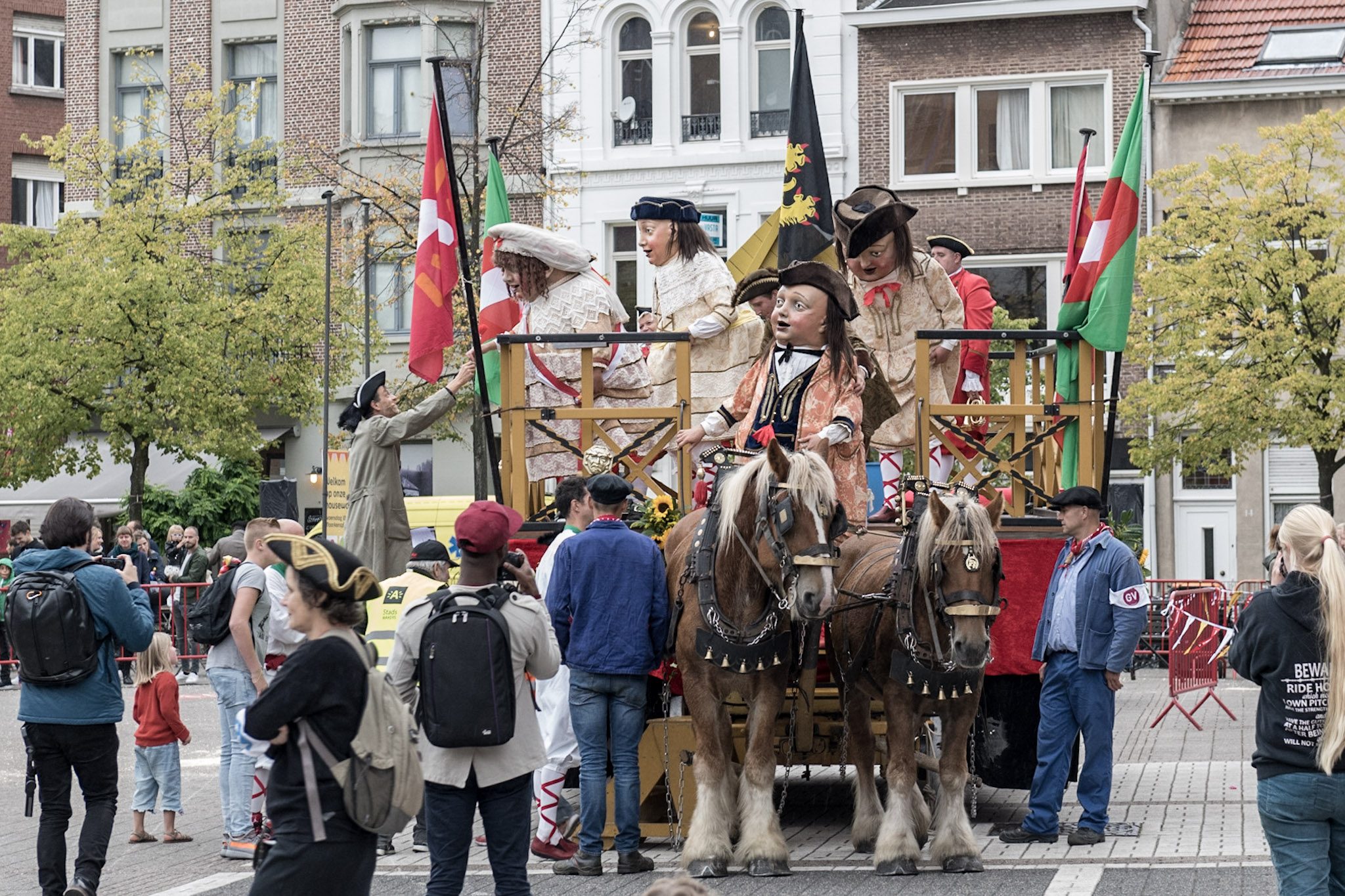
The "little giants" of Borgerhout resemble Spanish cabezudos

=== France ===
The giant is one of the symbols of the Nord-Pas-de-Calais region. It is the object of ancestral cultural practices that are still kept alive. Present at regional festivals and events, he represents the northern community.

The region currently has more than 450 giants, spread over the whole territory. There are nevertheless more dynamic intra-regional zones, located around central points. The Flemish part of the region is a land of giants; each city has one or more of them. Examples include Reuze Papa and Reuze Maman of Cassel, Tisje Tasje of Hazebrouck, Jean de Bûcheron and La Belle Hélène in Steenvoorde, and Totor of Steenwerck. In the South, in the Languedoc region, there is the Pézenas colt, and in the Provence, the tarasque of Tarascon (Bouches-du-Rhône).

- Cassel: Reuze Papa and Reuze Maman
- Douai: Gayant, Marie Cagenon, Fillon, Jacquot, Binbin
- Pézenas: le Poulain
- Tarascon: la Tarasque
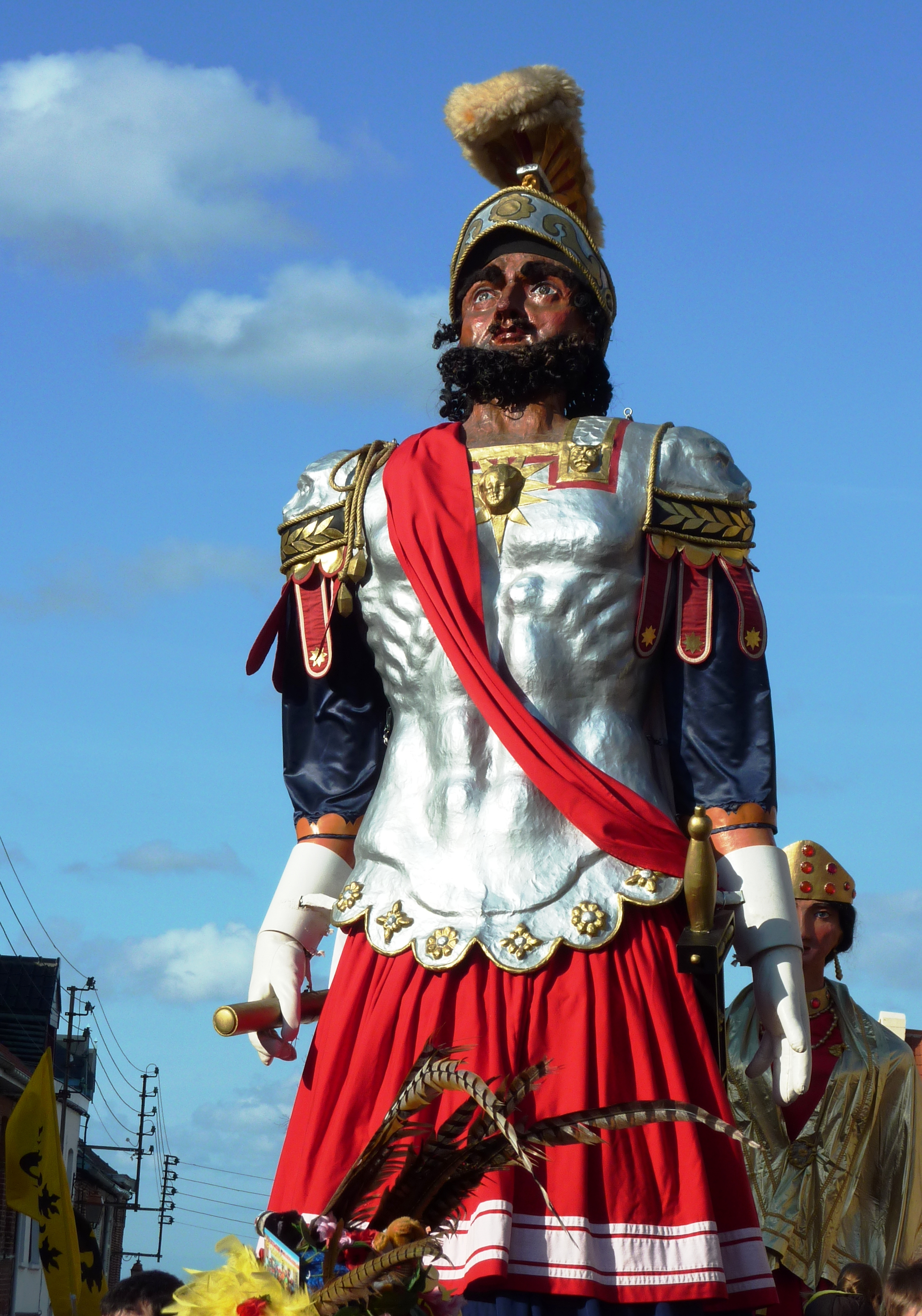
Reuze Papa of Cassel, France

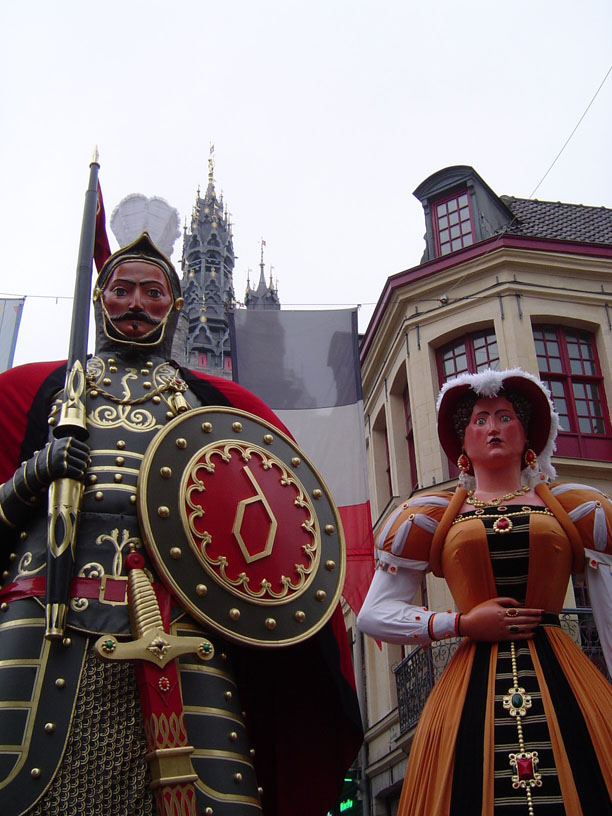
Giants couple; Gayant and Marie Cagenon, Douai, France

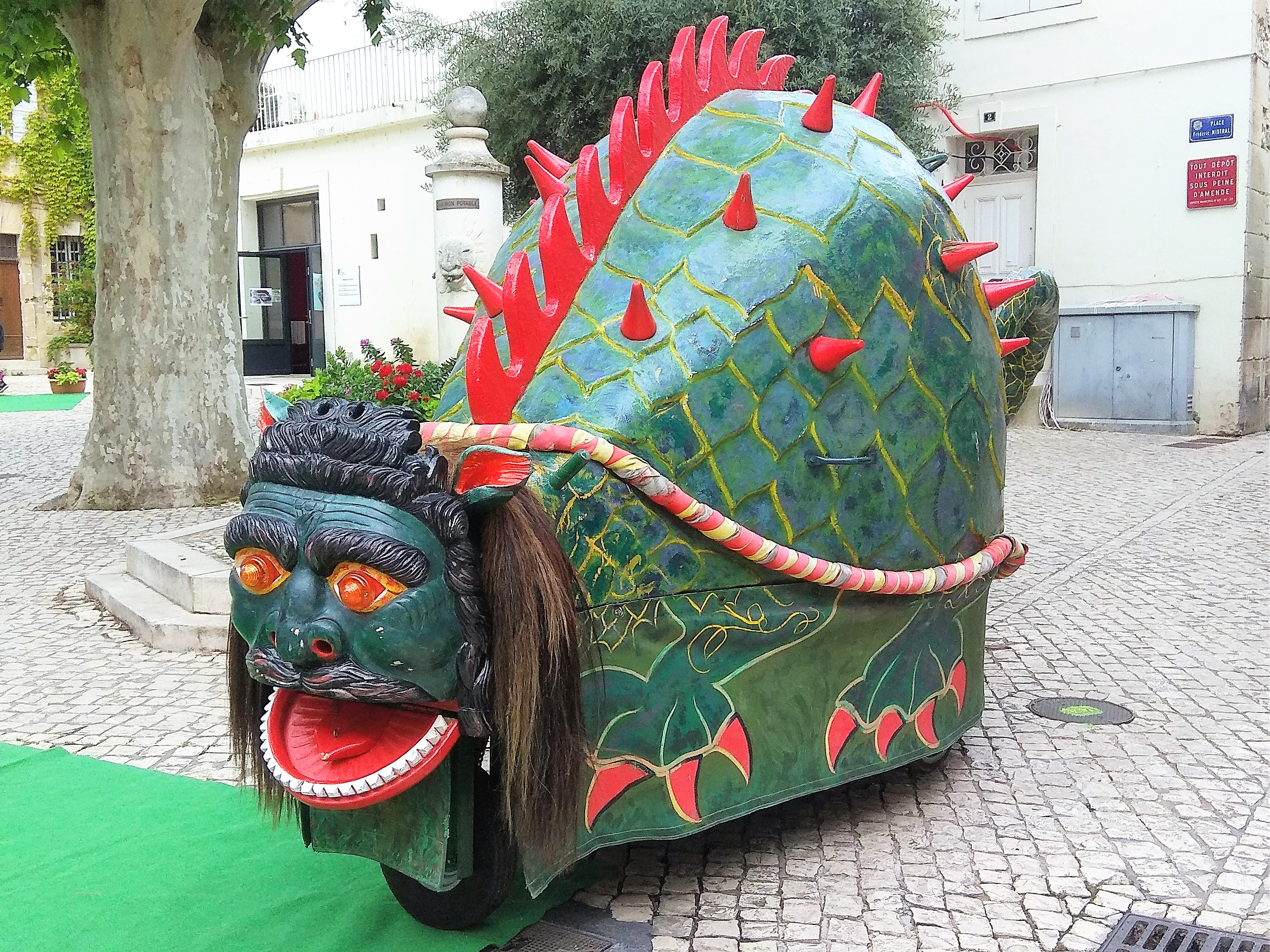
Fibreglass Tarasque in Tarascon, France

=== Spain ===
==== Gigantes/Gegants ====
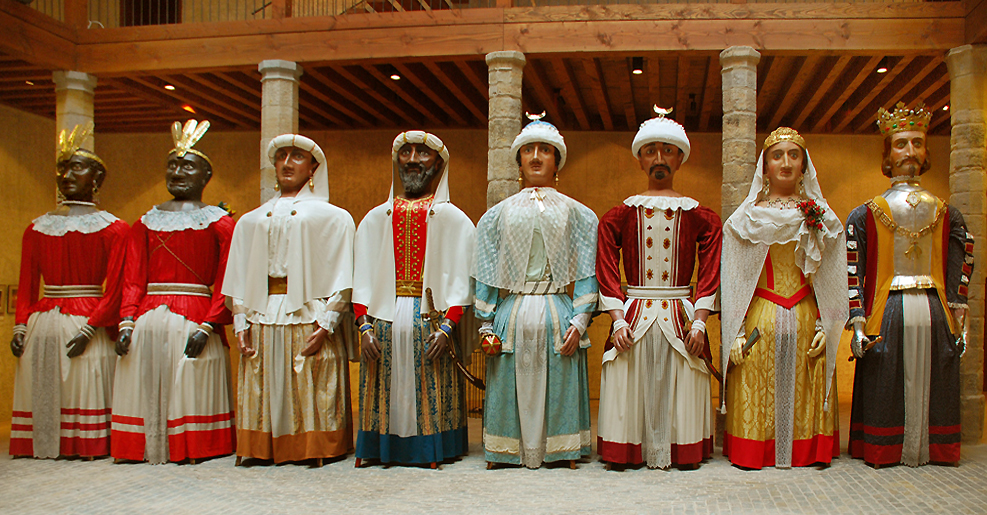
Gigantes of Pamplona, Navarre, Spain

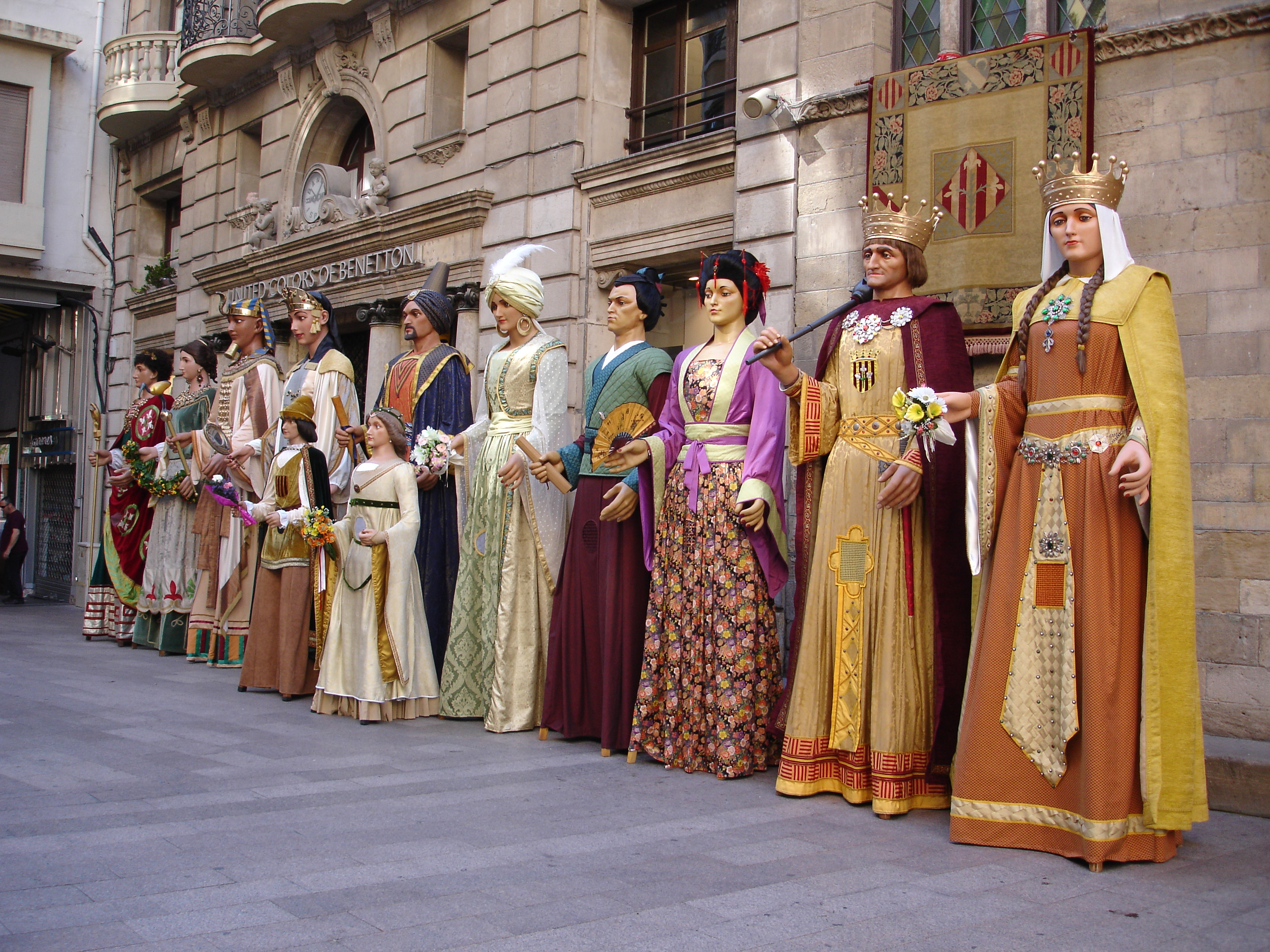
Gegants of Lleida, Catalonia, Spain

The giants are usually hollow figures several meters tall, with a painted paper maché head and arms, the rest of the body being covered in cloth and other clothing. Their frame is usually made of wood or aluminium, with carton-pierre—a mixture of papier-mâché and plaster of paris—used to make the head and hands. The frame of the body is hidden by cloth, and the arms typically have no structural element to allow them to swing in the air when the giant is turned.

Within the frame is an individual controlling the giant. He carries a harness on his shoulder that is linked to the internal structure, and will move and shake the giant in a dance, usually accompanied by a local marching band. Typically, these dances will include at least two giants, the male gigante and the female giantess, called giganta or gigantona, though some towns have multiple couples. Badalona for example has two couples of giants.

The figures usually depict archetypes of the town, such as the bourgeois and the peasant woman, or historical figures of local relevance, such as a founding king and queen, or pairs of Moorish and Christian nobles.

==== Cabezudos/Capgrossos/Cabuts ====
Cabezudos (Spanish), capgrossos (Catalan) or cabuts (Valencian) are smaller figures, usually to the human scale, that feature an oversized, carton-pierre head. The heads are worn with a matching costume. The person dressed as cabezudo will use one hand to hold his head, while the other hand carries a whip or pig bladder, used to frighten children or young women. Seeing through the "mouth" of the head, he will chase after these people, though he might pause to calm a frightened child.

As with the giants, the cabezudos typically represent archetypes of their town.

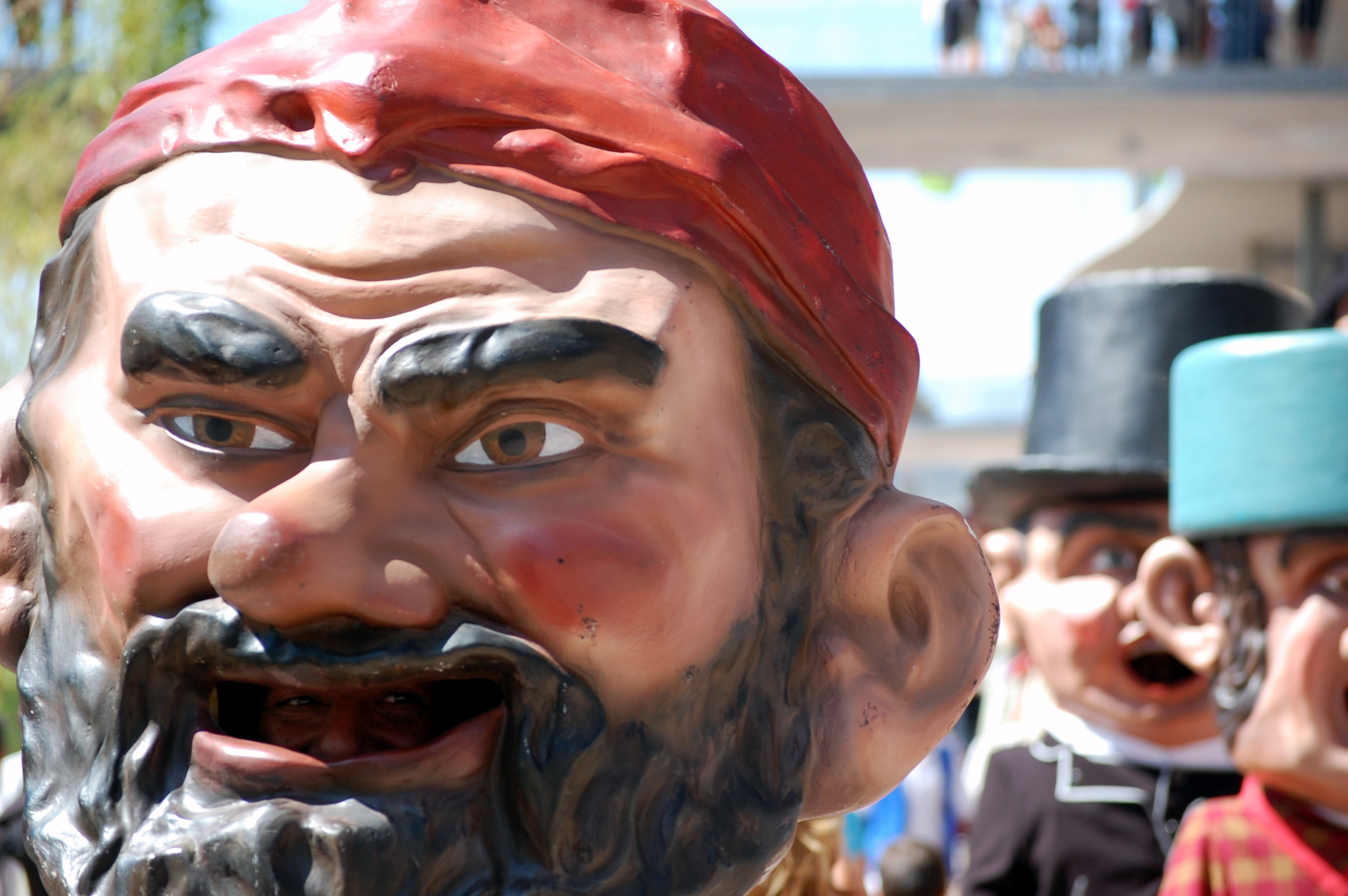
Cabezudos from Zaragoza, Aragon, Spain

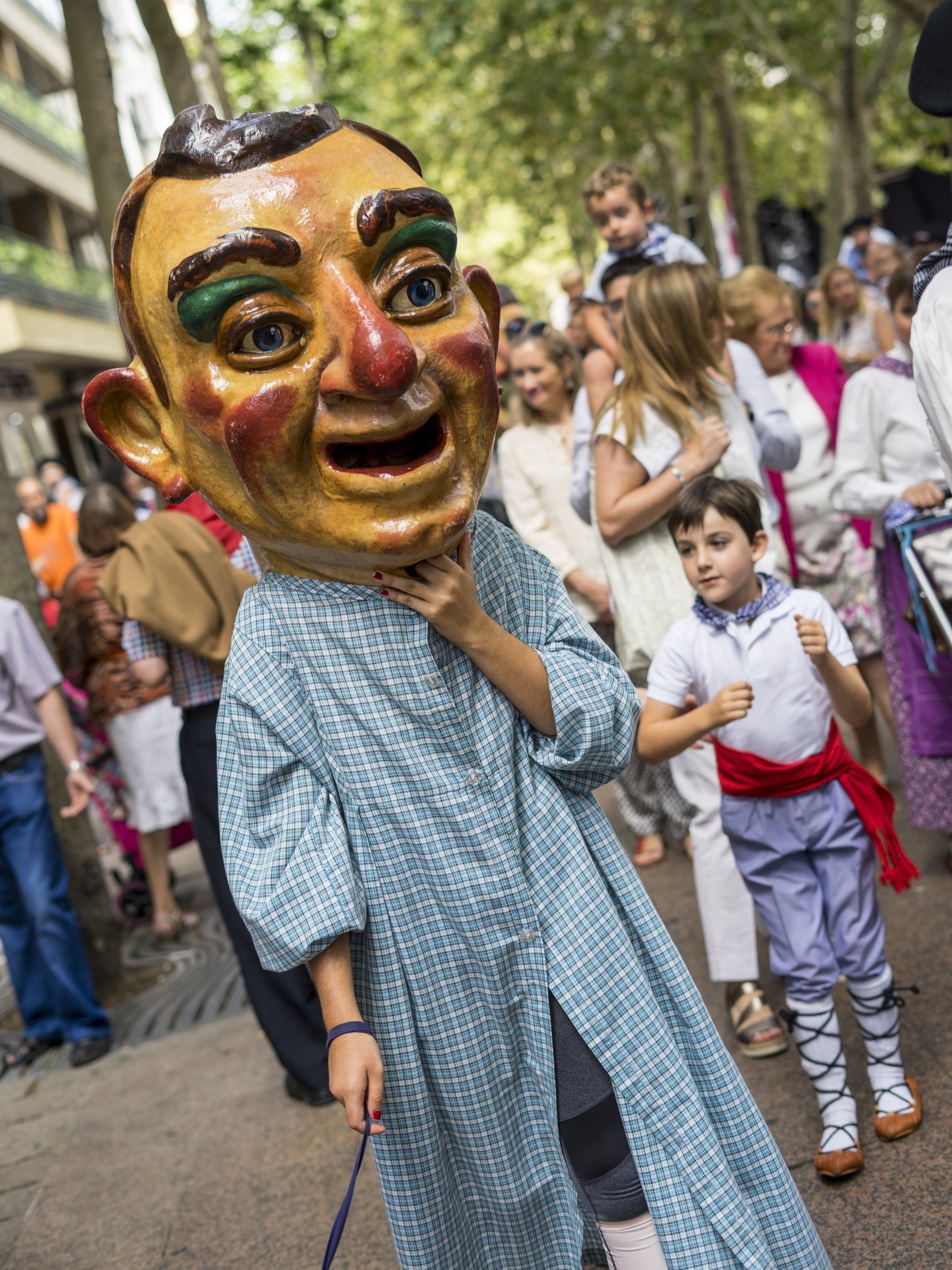
A cabezudo from Vitoria, Navarre, Spain

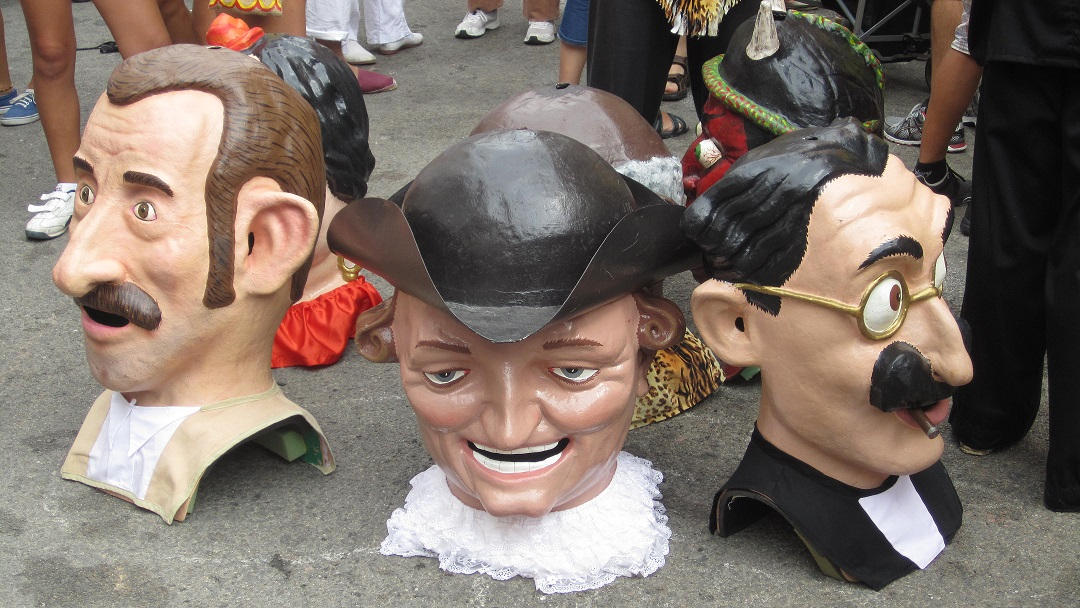
Capgrossos from Sitges, Catalonia, Spain

==== Zarzuela ====
Gigantes y cabezudos is also the title of an 1898 zarzuela, with music by Manuel Fernández Caballero, set in Saragossa and featuring a contemporary event: the Spanish army's return from the disastrous defeat of the Cuban War of Independence. The action unfolds during the festival of the Fiestas del Pilar, and concludes with a rousing jota focusing on the stereotypically strong, hardy character of the Aragonese, comparing them to the ever-battling "Gigantes" and "Cabezudos".

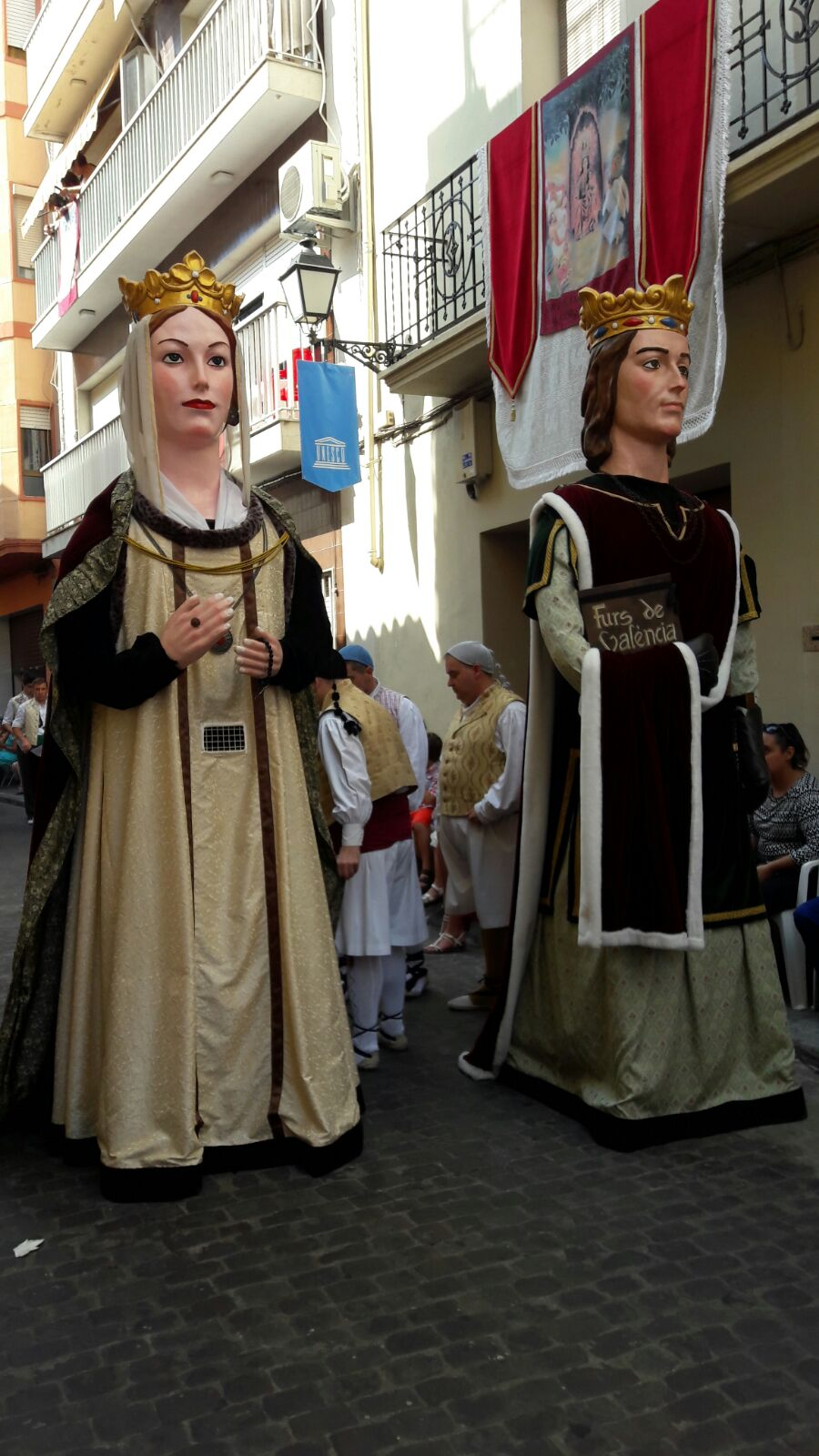
Gegants at La Mare de Déu de la Salut Festival from Algemesí, Valencia, Spain

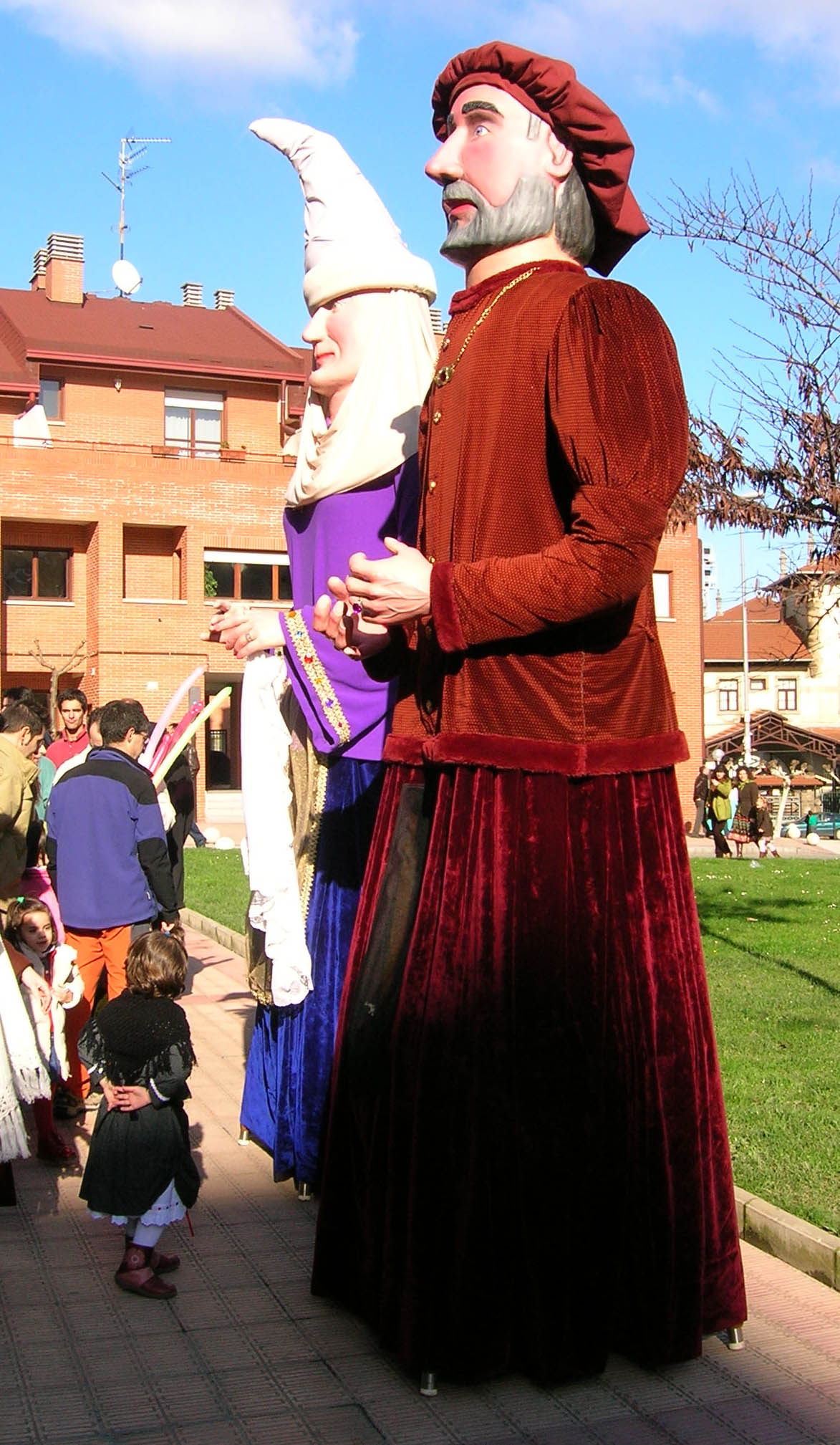
Gigantes of Barakaldo, Basque Country, Spain

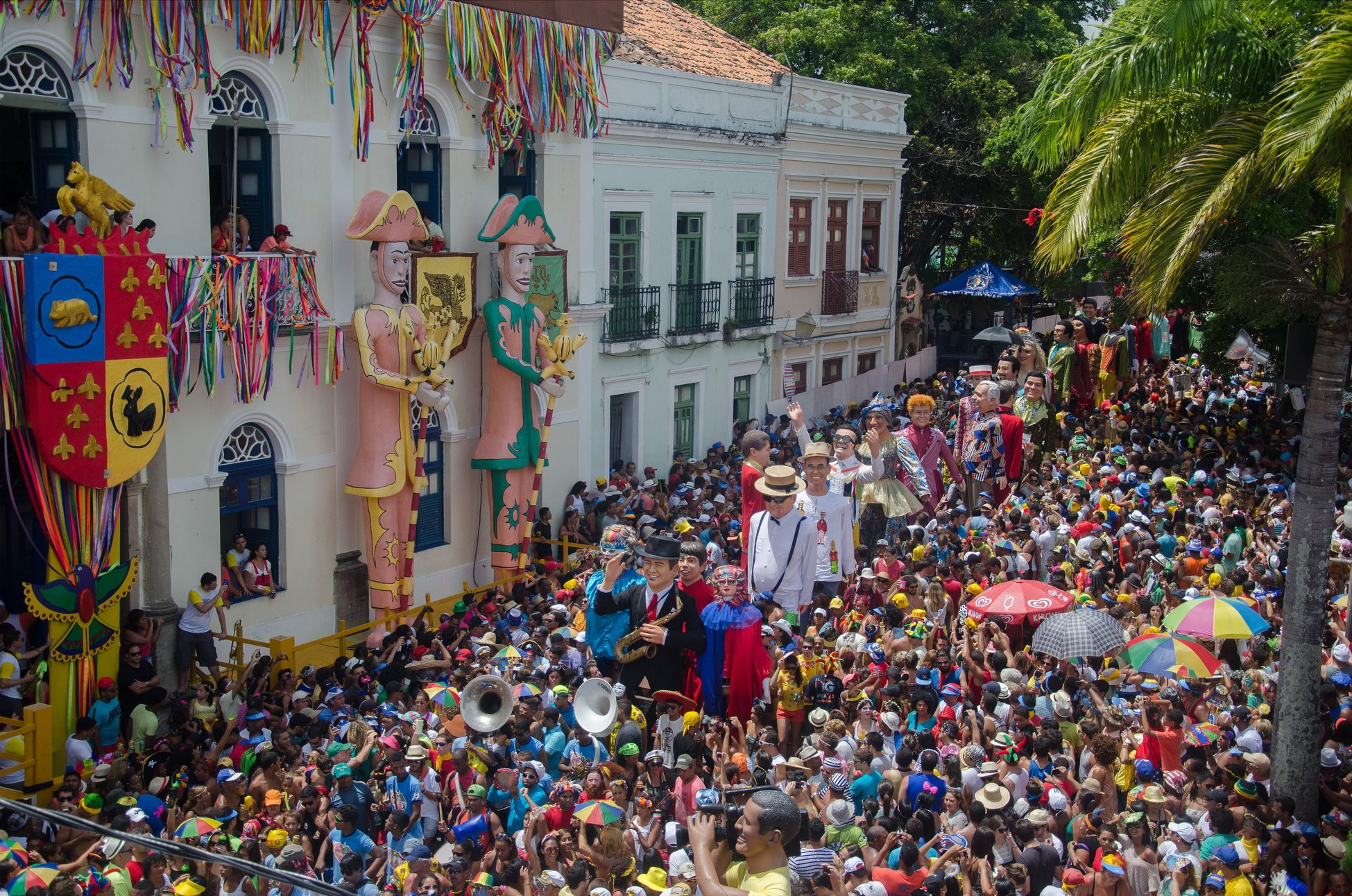
Bonecos d'Olinda, Olinda, Brazil

==== Patum de Berga ====
The Patum of Berga celebration combines several of the elements mentioned above.

=== Italy ===
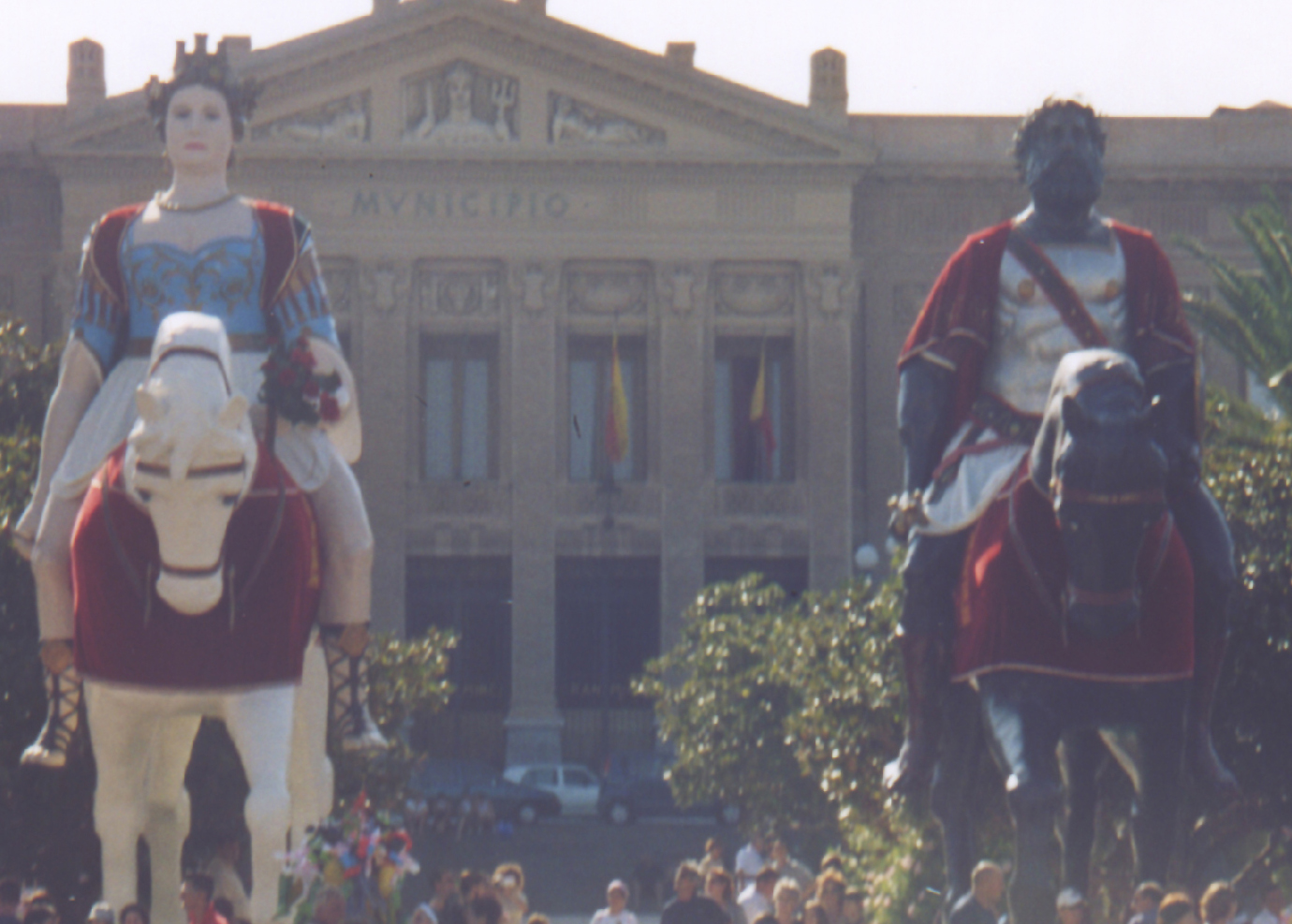
Mata and Grifone in Messina

I Giganti, usually representing a white woman named Mata and a black warrior named Grifone, are two tall papier-mâché figures that are carried on shoulders or pulled along, dancing to the rhythm of drums, through the streets of Messina, Palmi, Rosarno, Siderno, Cinquefrondi, Polistena, San Giorgio Morgeto and other towns in Sicily and Calabria, on the occasion of Catholic patronal festivals or other events. In Messina, the Giants are identified with the legendary founders of the city, and from this derives their importance in folk tradition. They are believed to represent the struggle between Moors and Christians.

=== England ===
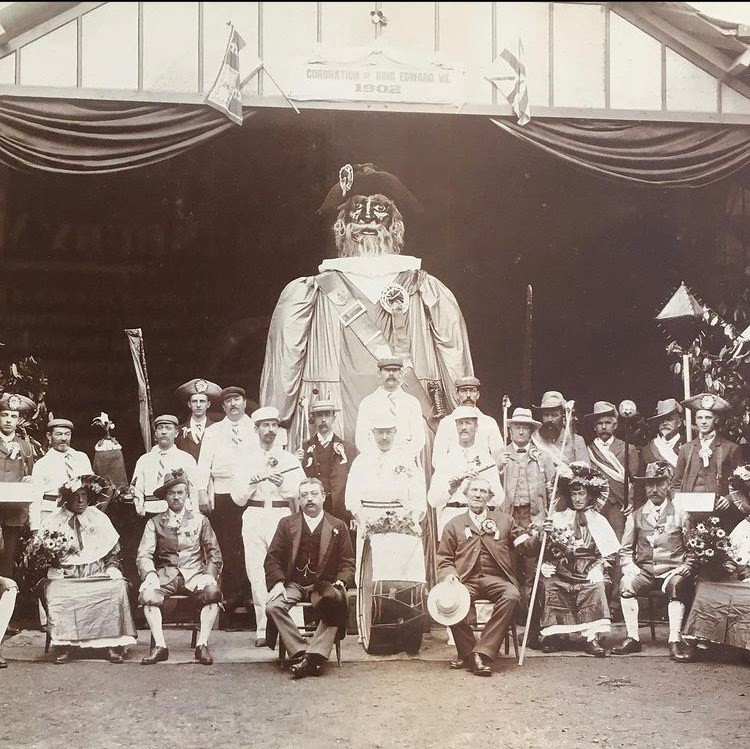
The Salisbury Giant, Saint Christopher, upon the coronation of King Edward VII, 1902. Photograph from the Salisbury Museum

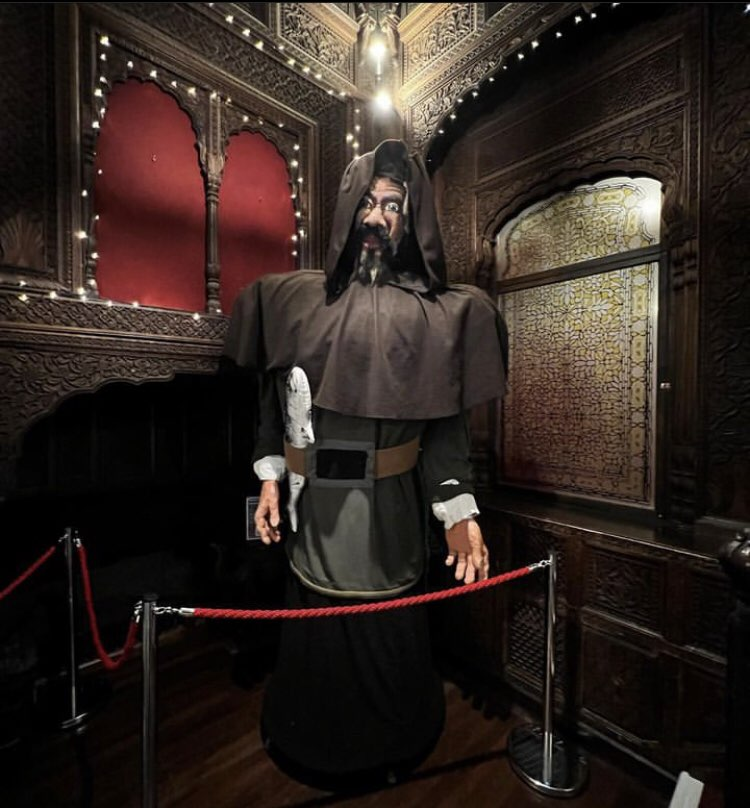
Mr Fishy on display at Hastings Museum and Art Gallery, 2023

England's most famous gianteering tradition is arguably that of the Jack in the Green, however the country is also host to giants more visually similar to those of continental Europe. These giants may represent figures of folklore and pseudohistory, or can be more general personifications. The earliest record of a processional giant in England is a reference from 1570 to the Salisbury Giant who processed on the eve of St John the Baptist's Day, or Midsummer's Day. The Salisbury Giant, a depiction of Saint Christopher, is believed by some to date to the 1400s, and was owned by the Tailor's Guild before being purchased by the Salisbury Museum in 1873. St Agnes, Cornwall, hosts the May festival Bolster Day featuring a processional giant that represents the mythical giant Bolster. Other English giants include Nathandriel, The Morrigan, War and Peace, Hannah Clarke, Gog and Magog, and Mr Fishy. There also exists a variant of giant called a Ninnie which consists only of a large hollow mask which covers the entire head and leaves the wearer's body uncovered, similar to the oversized heads of American sports mascots. Carriers of English processional giants are called porters, or dancers.

=== Philippines ===
The Higantes Festival is held in Angono, Rizal between 22 and 23 November since the late 19th century.

== Other figures ==
- Celedón
- Hobby horse
- Joaldun
- Judas Iscariot
- Olentzero
- Toro de fuego
- Zanpantzar

== See also ==
- Processional giants and dragons in Belgium and France
- Giant puppet
- Ogoh-ogoh (Balinese)
- Ondel-ondel (Betawi people)
