= Badalona giants =

The Badalona giants (Catalan: gegants de Badalona) are the four pairs of giants of the Catalan city of Badalona that represent historical prominent figures from the town. They dance in processions at Badalona's spring festival (in May), Badalona's principal festival (around 15 August) and on other occasions.

== Overview ==
The Giants are big and heavy figures made of wood, plaster and carton and typically represents historical prominent figures like kings, princess, counts or mythological beings. It is traditional that giants dance in important events or in the festivals of the city where they belong. It is a Catalan tradition but there are Giants in Belgium, France, Spain, Germany and other countries.

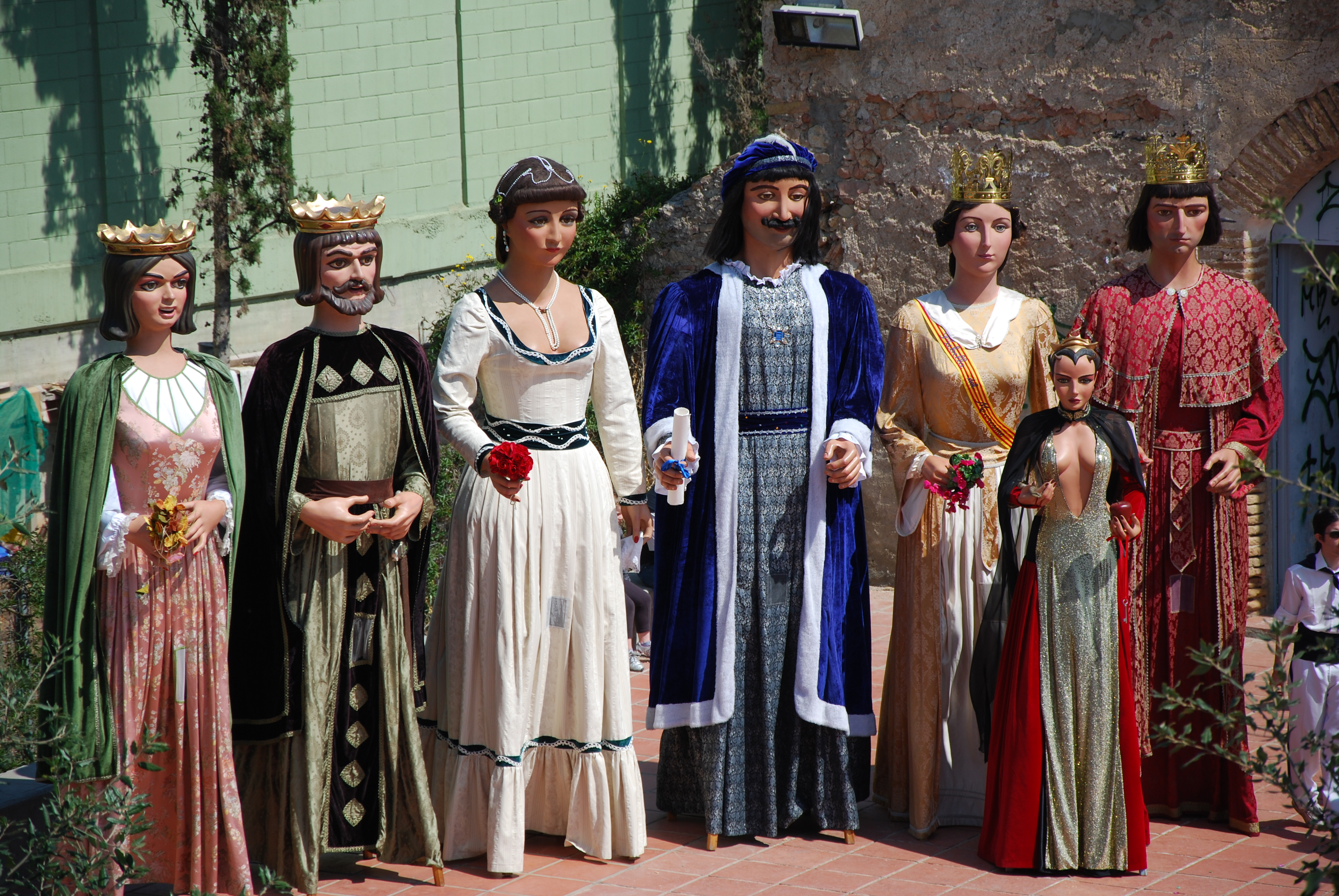
From right to left: Elionor de Santcliment, Ferrer de Gualbes, Maria, Anastasi, Badamar, Dimonieta (which is property of "la Colla de Geganters de Badalona") and Jeroni

In Badalona there are 8 giants: Anastasi and Maria (they were made in 1858) which are the oldest giants from the city; Jeroni and Badamar (from 1946); Ferrer de Gualbes and Elionor de Santcliment (from 1970), and Ripal and Brunel·la del Mar, the newests giants (from 1982).

== See also ==
- Processional giant
