= Enric Juliana =

Spanish journalist

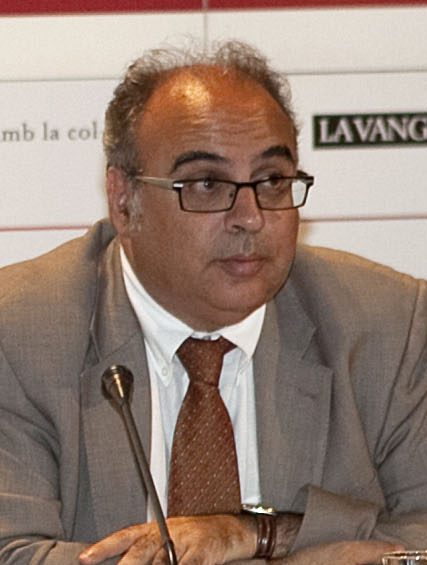
- Born: 1957; Badalona
- Employer: La Vanguardia (1991–)
- Awards: Commander of the Order of the Star of Italy (2009)

Enric Juliana Ricart (born 1957) is a Spanish journalist and political commentator.

== Biography ==
Born in Badalona in 1957, he became a journalist at a young age, joining the Barcelona-based daily newspaper Tele/eXprés in 1975, later working for El Món, TVE and El País. A member of the Unified Socialist Party of Catalonia (PSUC) in his youth, he also was a member of the editorial office of the weekly party magazine Treball.

He was hired by La Vanguardia in 1991. From 1997 to 2000, he was destined as correspondent to Italy. He was appointed as deputy-editor of La Vanguardia in 2000, also becoming the newspaper's delegate to Madrid in 2004.

== Works ==
Author

- — (2006). La España de los pingüinos. Barcelona: Destino.
- — (2009). La deriva de España. Geografía de un país vigoroso y desorientado. Barcelona: RBA.
- — (2012). Modesta España. Otra respuesta al declive. Barcelona: RBA.
- (2015) Tarjeta negra: 80 días que convulsionaron la política española (RBA, 2015). ç
- Aquí no hemos venido a estudiar (Arpa, 2020).
- España, el pacto y la furia (Arpa, 2024).
- Viaje a un nuevo mundo (Arpa, 2026)

Coauthor

- Iglesias, Pablo; Juliana, Enric (2018). Nudo España. Arpa Ediciones.

== Decorations ==
- Commander of the Order of the Star of Italian Solidarity (2009)
