= Institute of Predictive and Personalized Medicine of Cancer =

Research institute in Spain

The Institute of Predictive and Personalized Medicine of Cancer (IMPPC) (Barcelona) is located in Badalona as a research institute set up by the Consejo Superior de Investigaciones Científicas (CSIC), the Universitat Autònoma de Barcelona (UAB), the City Council of Badalona, the Catalan Institute of Health (ICS), The Germans Trias i Pujol University Hospital (HUGTiP) and the Institute for Health Science Research Germans Trias i Pujol (FIICSGTiP). The IMPCC is adjacent to the Institute for Health Science Research Germans Trias i Pujol. The mission of the IMPPC is to identify the molecular patterns that are predictors of the development of a cancer and can inform its personalized treatment.
