= El Manresà =

Human settlement in Badalona, Barcelonès, Barcelona Province, Spain

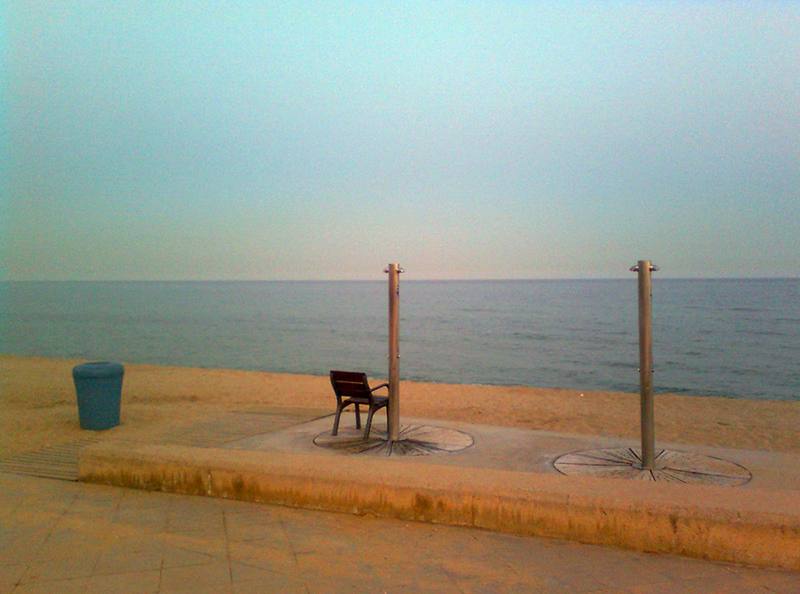

El Manresà is a neighbourhood of Badalona, located next the sea in the north limit of city with Montgat. It belongs to district 1.

During the 19th century appeared a small slum in the outskirts of Badalona by the sea and near to the municipality limit with Montgat. In fact, the name is first documented in 1827 in the cadastre and it comes from a masia of the area called Cal Manresà, which was demolished in 1968 with the construction of the C-31 highway.

The neighbourhood has a low population. In 2015 it had 339 inhabitants. The growth is related with the near neighbourhood of Les Mallorquines of Montgat, however new inhabitants arrived in the 1950s as a result of an immigration process. Since the 1970s the neighborhood suffered a process of depopulation because of the establishment of and industrial area, and the neighbors organised themselves and created an association in aim to preserve the neighborhood. Today the area is dedicated to industry and households at a time, which has produced some conflicts between the neighbours and the industries.

Its beach is named Barca Maria, it has a length of 660 metres, between the stream of Vallmajor and the passage of Cussó.

A notable neighbour is Dolors Sabater, who was mayor of Badalona from 2015 to 2018.
