= Joaldun =

Basque carnival character

Joaldun is a traditional carnival character in the Basque culture of Navarre, especially in two small villages in the north of the province, Ituren and Zubieta. His function is to shake cowbells to alert people to the beginning of the carnival, which is celebrated annually on the last weekend of January.

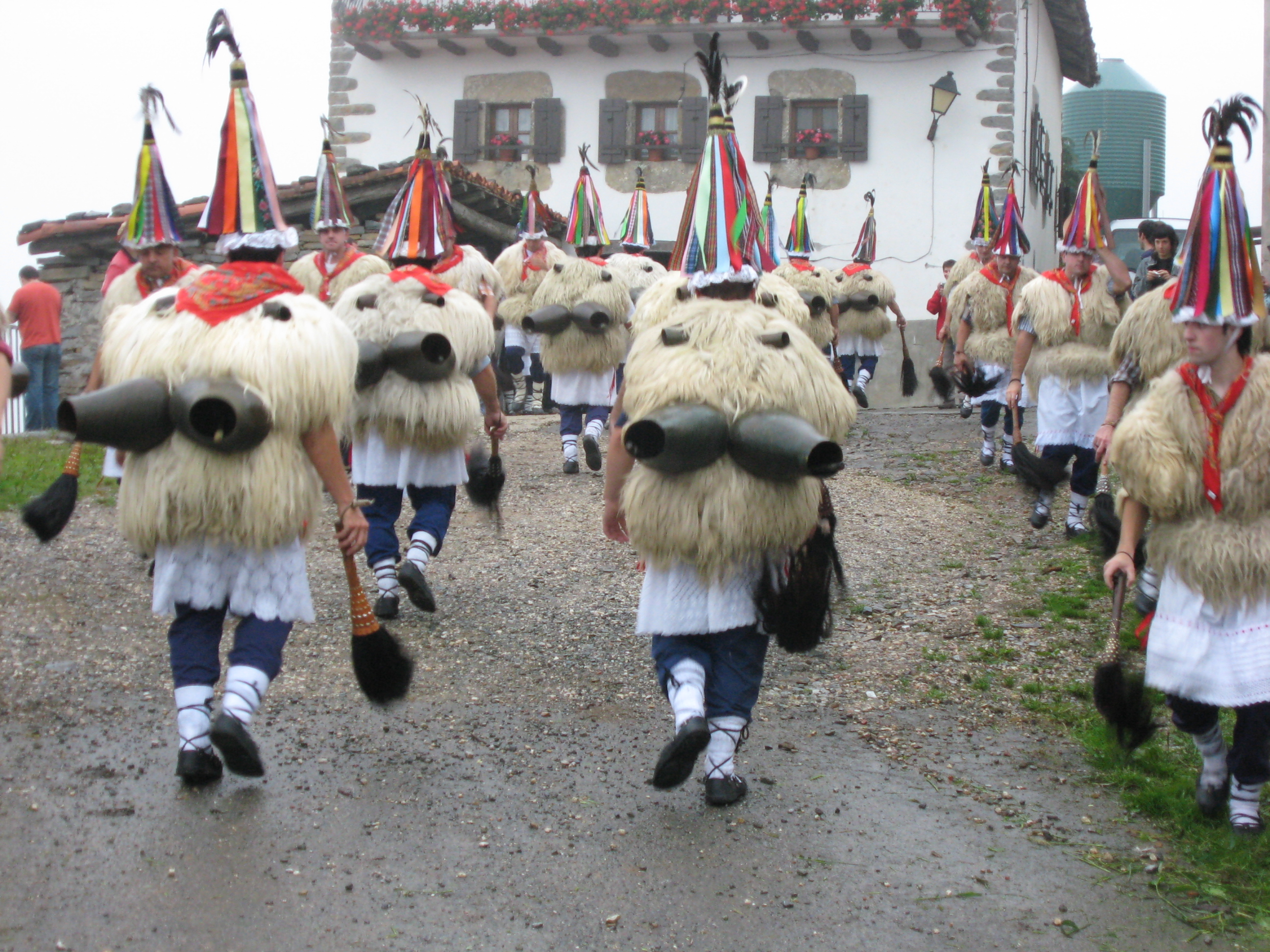
The Joaldunak in Ituren, on the road to Zubieta.

== Location ==
Location of Navarre

The Joaldun tradition takes place in Navarre, especially in the region of Malerreka. Ituren and Zubieta are located in the Pyrenees, 56.5 km due north of Pamplona, capital city of Navarre. They are situated on the flood plain of the River Ezkurra, a tributary of the River Bidasoa, in the shadow of the Mendaur mountain (1060m). The distance between the two villages is no more than 3 km.

== Name ==
Although its original name is Joaldun, the character is referred to by several other monikers, including kaldurro, ttuntturro, and txantxurro. However, the most used (albeit not totally correct) name is Zanpantzar. This name has become more common in recent years, although it is not used in Zubieta or Ituren. Zanpantzar can refer to both the carnival itself and to a doll made of straw and fern who is famously tried, sentenced, and burnt during the carnival of some Basque villages (this process is part of a cleansing ritual that is said to burn diseases at the same time as the doll).

== Costume ==
The original suit of a Zanpantzar had specific characteristics, but in the present day each individual group has modified the costume. The features of the costume are:

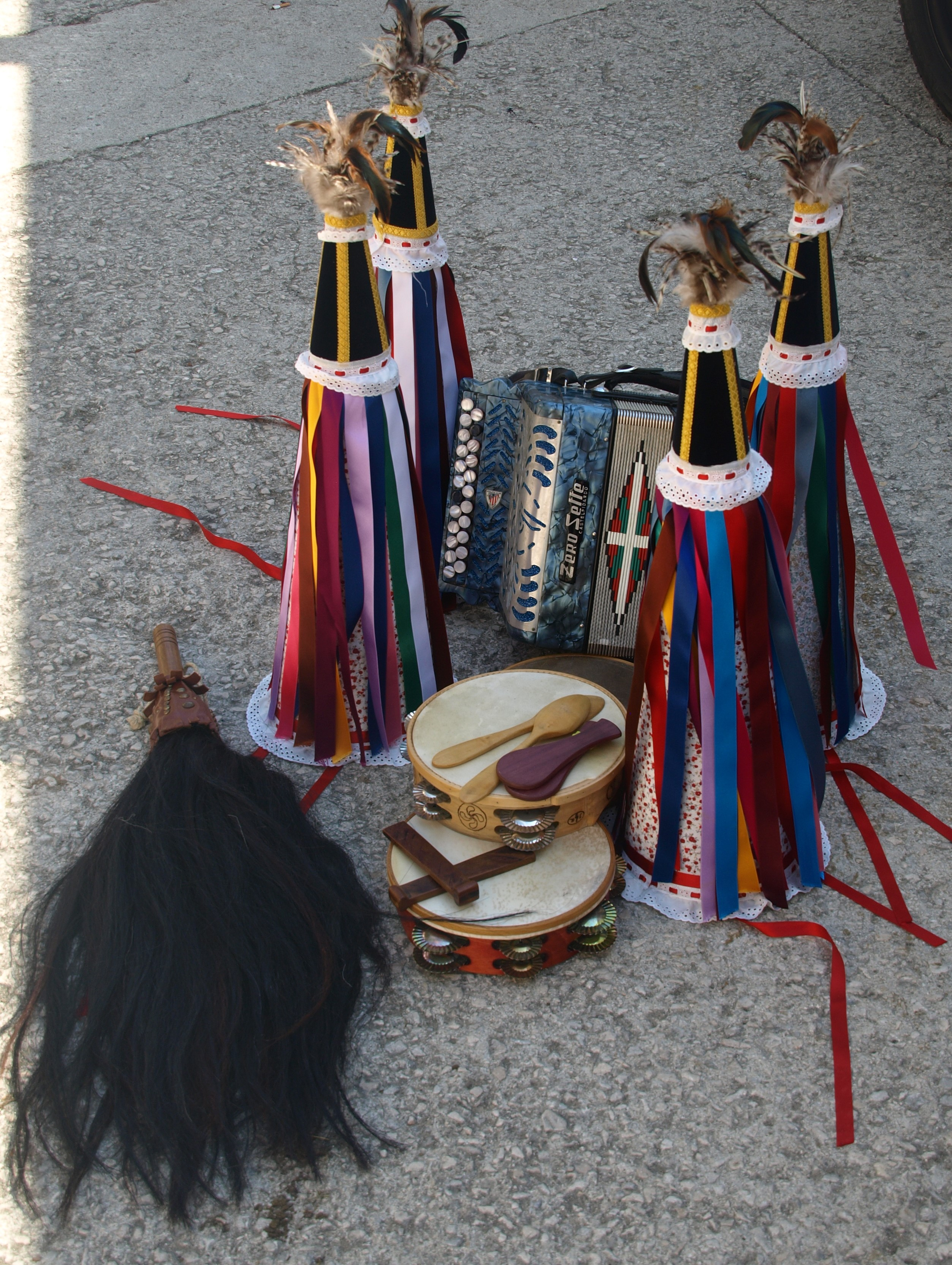
Hats, sprinkler and musical instruments of the Joaldunak.

- A conical hat, the tunturro, which is 0.5 metres long with colourful ribbons and feathers, on the head.
- A kerchief around the neck.
- A shirt and short skirt made of sheepskin.
- Two cowbells at the waist.
- A white skirt.
- A sprinkler made of horsehair in the right hand.
- Abarcas as the footwear.

=== Variations ===
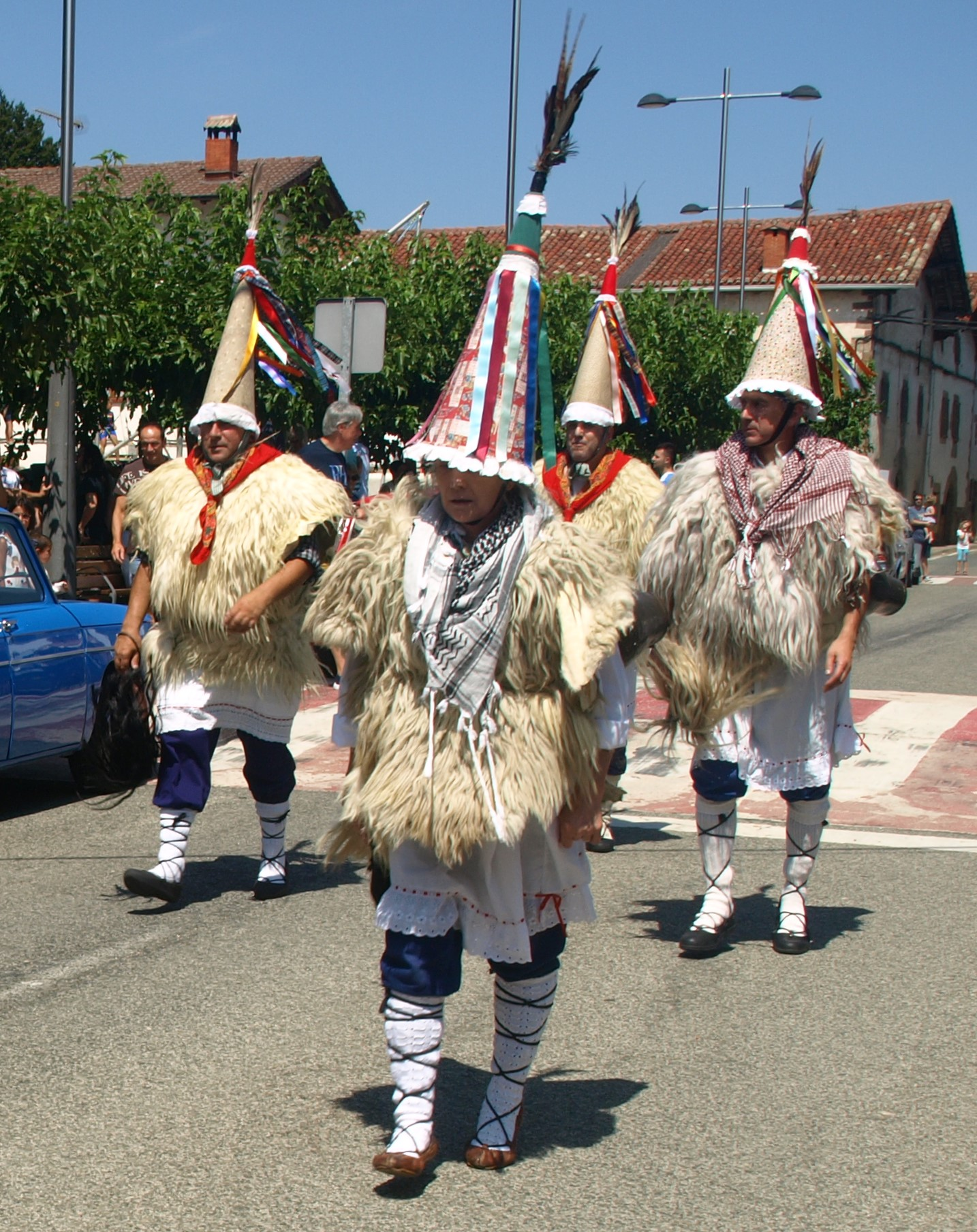
A variation with a Palestinian keffiyeh

Although the costumes are similar to each other, there is some variation between villages:

- The Zubieta costume does not include the fur-lined jacket as the attire of Ituren does.
- The kerchief in Zubieta is a blue square and smaller than that of Ituren, which is red.

== Roles ==
Traditionally, the costume could only be worn by men, normally locals over the age of 18. In recent years, however, some women have begun to dress up as Joaldun. Children can sometimes march behind their older relatives.

== The carnival ==
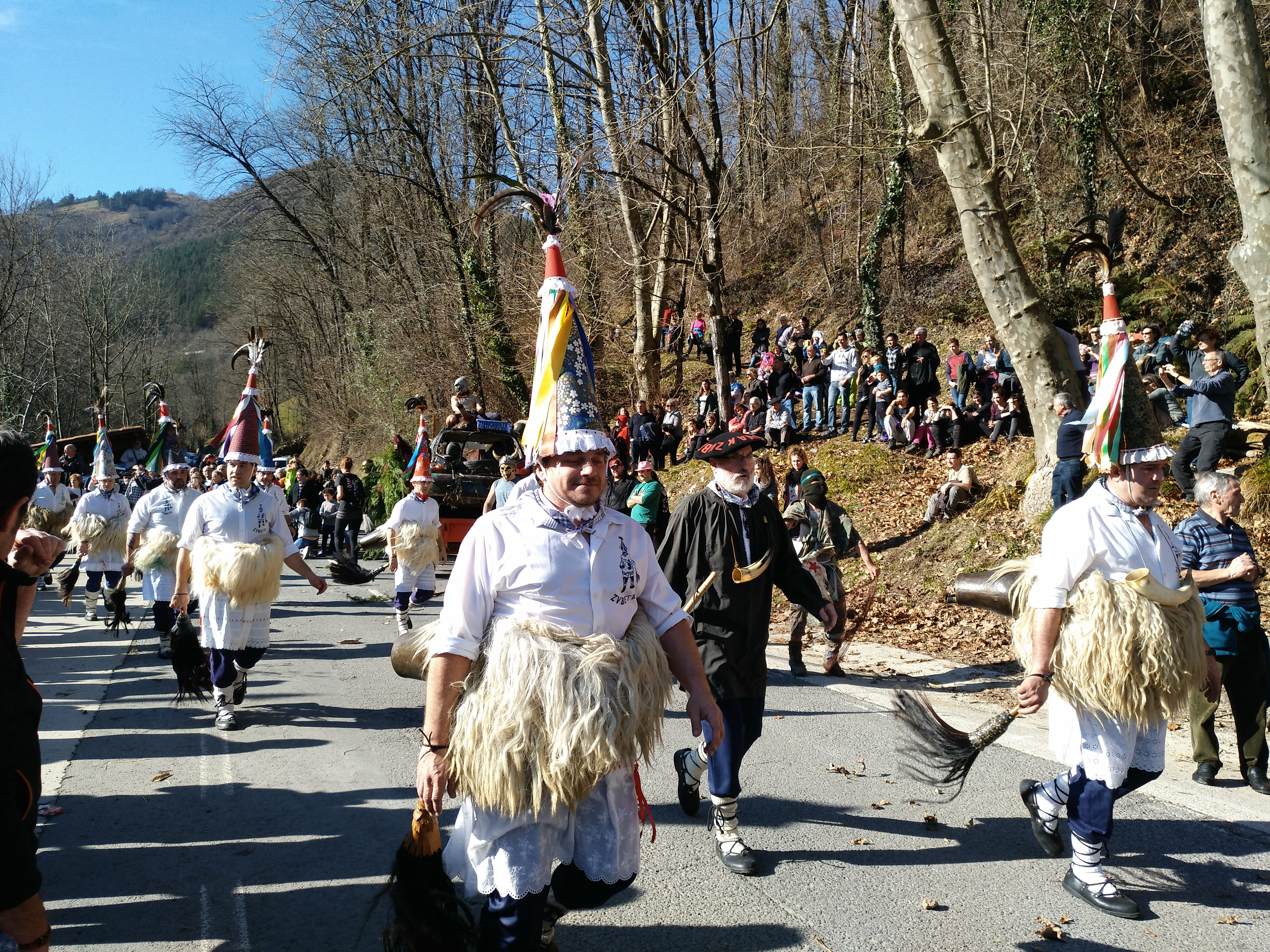

The Joalduna is the character who warns of the arrival of the carnival, and is the centrepoint of the celebration. The origin of the carnival and its purpose are not known, but the tradition is thought to be linked to the canching and mysticism. The Joaldunak (plural) are said to have been creatures who protected cattle, and may also have chased away evil spirits, thus favouring good harvests.

=== The parade ===
Joaldun parade

On Monday at noon, the Zubietar Joaldunak set off for Ituren (the road is only 3 km). The route follows the course of the Ezkurra river, which flows around the Mendaur mountain, a geographic coincidence that gives the region its name, Malerreka (from Basque "malda eta erreka", "slope and river").

Halfway along the route, they are met by the people of the people of Ituren's Aurtitz neighborhood . Thereafter, they go towards the neighbourhood of Lasaga to join with the Joaldunak of Ituren. There, the joint parade of approximately forty or fifty Joaldunak (with between eighty and one hundred bells) begins, which, after passing through the centre of Ituren, ends in the village square. A communal lunch is held in the square to celebrate the brotherhood of the villages.

On the following day, Tuesday, the Ituren Joaldunak pay a return visit to those of Zubieta. This is the end of the carnival.

== Joaldunen biltzarra ==
Every year, a celebration is held to honour all the Basque groups that have kept the tradition. This is not confined to just the Navarre villages; many Basque towns have taken up Joaldunak groups since the establishment of the "Joaldunen biltzarra" ("Joaldun assembly"). The festivities include parades, concerts, communal feasts and musical events.

== See also ==
- Gigantes y cabezudos
