= Gorg, Badalona =

Coordinates: 41.4413°N 2.2364°E

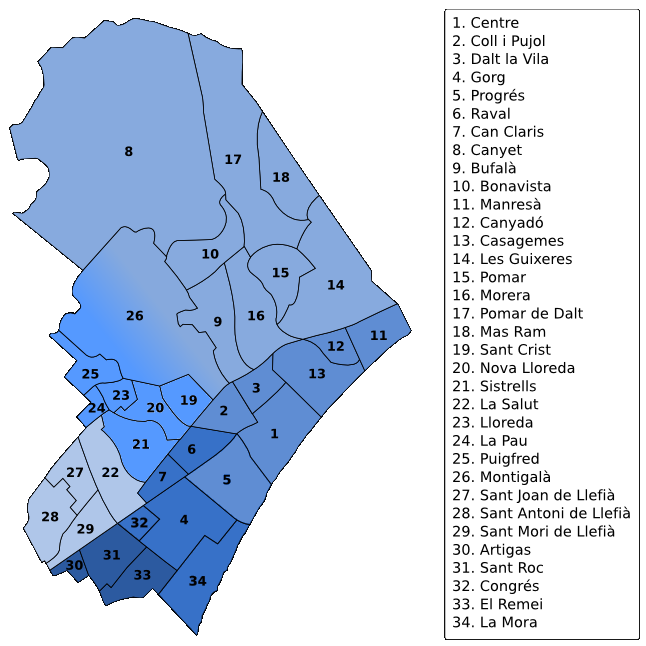
Administrative divisions of Badalona.

Gorg (Catalan pronunciation: [ˈɡork]) is a neighborhood of Badalona (Catalonia, Spain) which belongs to the town's District 5 and consequently part of the metropolitan area of Barcelona. Gorg owes its origins to the Industrial Revolution and the substantial growth of the Barcelona area. It still contains a great number of factories, but the area has been recently subject to profound changes. Developers related to Marina Badalona have been involved with the ongoing transformation of the area. The area is home to the 1992 Summer Olympics venue Palau Municipal d'Esports de Badalona. Construction of an urban canal connecting the marina with the sports arena through Gorg has long been put on hold until now that many real state agencies are detecting the raise of a new and modern neighborhood and the canal is already constructed.

== Transport ==
Public transport improved substantially during the 2000s (decade) with the Trambesòs and the Barcelona Metro upgrades that took place during the decade. Tram and metro station Gorg opened in 1985 as part of L4, but the original service was transferred to L2, and it is currently served by L10 as well.
