= Centre, Badalona =

Coordinates: 41°26′57″N 2°14′54″E

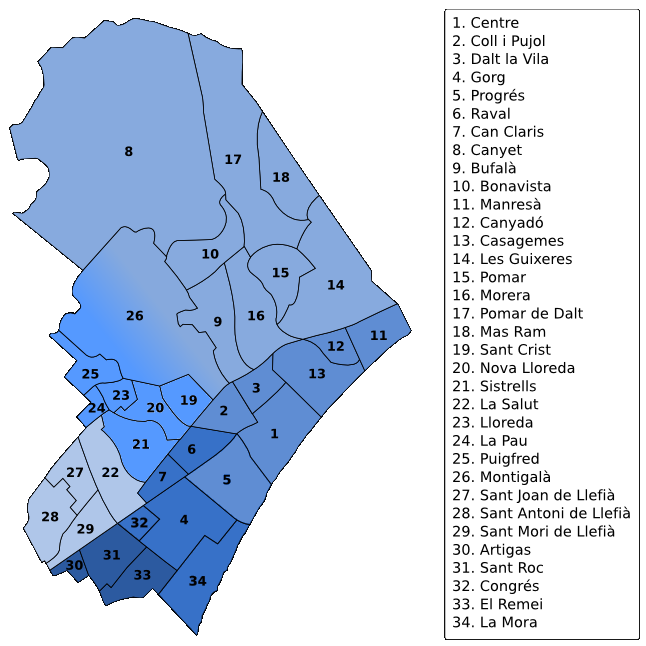
Administrative divisions of Badalona.

Centre is the usual name for the central area of Badalona, a locality in the metropolitan area of Barcelona (Catalonia, Spain). It is located in the District 1 by the Mediterranean Sea, and is a commercial and residential area with good transportation connections. It had 1344 inhabitants in the 2010 census.

== Barcelona Metro ==
The neighbourhood is served by Barcelona Metro stations Pep Ventura and Badalona Pompeu Fabra, on L2.
