= Badalona =

- Municipality
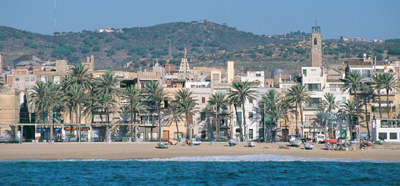

- Flag Coat of arms
- Interactive map of Badalona
- Location within Catalonia Location within Spain
- Coordinates: 41°26′56″N 2°14′46″E
- Country: Spain
- Autonomous community: Catalonia
- Province: Barcelona
- Region: Barcelona
- County: Barcelonès

Government
  - Mayor: Xavier García Albiol (2023) (PP)

Area
  - Total: 20.96 km^{2} (8.09 sq mi)
- Elevation: 12 m (39 ft)

Population (2025)
  - Total: 230,642
  - Rank: 22nd in Spain
  - Density: 11,000/km^{2} (28,500/sq mi)
- Demonyms: Badalonian (en); Badaloní; Badalonina (ca))
- Postal code: 08910-08918
- Area code: (+34) 934
- Climate: Csa
- Website: badalona.cat

Badalona (/ˌbædəˈloʊnə/, US also /ˌbɑːd-/, Catalan: [bəðəˈlonə], Spanish: [baðaˈlona]) is a city and municipality in the autonomous community of Catalonia in Spain. It is located to the north east of Barcelona, on the left bank of the Besòs River and on the Mediterranean Sea, in the Barcelona metropolitan area. With a population of 230,642, it is the 4th-largest city in Catalonia and the 22nd-largest in Spain. It became a city in 1897.

== Etymology ==
The name Badalona comes from ancient Iberian word Baitolo according to the legend of several bronze coins of the end of the 2nd century BC found in the city. This word was the origin of the Latin name Baetulo that was as the Romans named the new city they founded off the coast of present Badalona. The oldest mention of the name Baetulo is from De Chorographia of Pomponius Mela (43–44 AD), who use the same name for the Besòs river (named Bissaucio during the Middle Ages). Following the Roman era, during the High Middle Ages the name Baetulo evolved to Bitulona, which was the most common name but not the only one, because it is found in the Latin written documents other versions as Bedelona, Bitilona, Betulona, Bedalona and even Vitulona. The current name is documented already in 997 and by the 14th century was the most used and generalized.

== History ==
The oldest traces of settlement date from the Neolithic (about 3500–2500 BC). Archaeological finds consisting of carved stone and flint tools have been discovered in the Seriol hill and Manresà areas along with tombs with grave goods in the quarters of Sistrells and Llefià. Deposits from the Bronze and Iron Age have been found in old brickyards (dated about 1800–1500 BC) and in the masies of Can Butinyà and Can Mora in the Canyet quarter (1500–1100 BC).

Before the Roman settlement of Hispania, the territory of Badalona was populated by Iberians who lived on the Boscà hill (198 metres above the sea level), from where it is possible to see the coastline. The settlement dates to at least the 4th century BC but was totally abandoned by the 1st century AD due to Romanization. Despite the presence of the Iberians, the city's origins are usually dated to around the year 100 BC, when the Romans founded a city ex novo on Rosés hill (26,8 metres) next to the coast. The Roman town plan was based on their common scheme of the cardo and decumanus, occupying some 10 ha, with a line of walls. The Roman city was very dynamic, especially during the reign of Augustus, with a specialised viniculture that produced wine for export all over the empire. From the 3rd century, the city went into decline and was almost depopulated as people fled to rustic villae. However, the few remains from Late antiquity prove that Baetulo was never abandoned.

The current city of Badalona was formed in the 10th century when a new urban nucleus was built over the old Roman city and around the old forum and temple, which was turned into a church. At the same time, a rural nucleus emerged outside the town walls. This rural-urban dichotomy would remain until the mid-18th century.

Sant Jeroni de la Murtra Monastery, built in the 14th century, is where the Catholic Monarchs would spend their summers. According to some authors, this is also where they received Christopher Columbus after his first voyage to the Americas.

During the first half of the 19th century, Badalona remained an agricultural and fishing centre. However, this changed in 1848 with the construction of the railway connecting the cities of Mataró and Barcelona, which brought a station to the village. This furthered the industrialization and economic development of Badalona and led to the progressive decline of the traditional economic sectors. Due to the arrival of new industries, Badalona also became an important centre of the labour movement. Thanks to this, the village began to attract newcomers, doubling its population from 5,733 (1851) to 10,485 (1857). By the end of the century Badalona had around 19.000 inhabitants. The demographic growth gave rise to urban development with an ensanche plan covering all along the coast from Sant Adrià to Montgat. In 1897, the city received the title of city from the queen regent Maria Christina of Austria.

The city's demographic growth continued mostly uncontrolled in the first third of the 20th century. This entailed the construction of new neighbourhoods without urban infrastructure and poor connections to the city centre. During the dictatorship of Primo de Rivera the city council tried to alleviate these problems by developing infrastructure, building a new school, market and slaughterhouse and expanding the sewage network; however, this was not enough. During the Second Republic, Badalona was often in turmoil, as would be the case during the civil war, when the city was bombed due to its importance as an industrial centre. After the end of the war, in 1940, the mayor Frederic Xifré was executed by the Francoists.

Franco's dictatorship brought about the decline of Badalona's varied pre-war cultural life. The period was also marked by the arrival of immigrants, mainly from the south of Spain, which further accelerated the city's demographic growth, precipitating the emergence of shanty towns with unhealthy conditions. The city's population increased from 92,200 in 1960 to 201,200 only fifteen years later. During the mandate of mayor Felipe Antoja, the city received poor migrants from Barcelona who lived in shanties; with the creation of poor neighbourhoods, Badalona had some of the lowest-quality housing in the country. Urban expansion also disturbed historical buildings and archaeological sites.

After the death of Franco, and especially from 1979, the city found a new social vitality through the organised neighbours' movement, which fought to improve infrastructure in their neighbourhoods, to combat real estate speculation, and to obtain urban improvements. On 29 January 1976, Badalona held the first protest to be tolerated without violence from the Spanish authorities in the post-Franco era. The city has also gone through a transformation from an industrial to a service economy. Badalona was a subsite of the 1992 Olympic Games, hosting the basketball and boxing competitions. Though Badalona is included in the Barcelona conurbation, it maintains its own identity, especially in the central neighbourhoods.

== Climate ==
Climate data for Badalona
| Month | Jan | Feb | Mar | Apr | May | Jun | Jul | Aug | Sep | Oct | Nov | Dec | Year |
|---|---|---|---|---|---|---|---|---|---|---|---|---|---|
| Mean daily maximum °C (°F) | 13.7 (56.7) | 14.1 (57.4) | 15.7 (60.3) | 17.4 (63.3) | 20.2 (68.4) | 23.7 (74.7) | 26.8 (80.2) | 27.9 (82.2) | 24.8 (76.6) | 21.5 (70.7) | 17.2 (63.0) | 14.4 (57.9) | 19.8 (67.6) |
| Daily mean °C (°F) | 10.1 (50.2) | 10.7 (51.3) | 12.5 (54.5) | 14.2 (57.6) | 17.4 (63.3) | 21.3 (70.3) | 24.3 (75.7) | 25.0 (77.0) | 21.8 (71.2) | 18.3 (64.9) | 13.7 (56.7) | 11.0 (51.8) | 16.7 (62.1) |
| Mean daily minimum °C (°F) | 6.7 (44.1) | 7.2 (45.0) | 9.3 (48.7) | 11.0 (51.8) | 14.6 (58.3) | 18.6 (65.5) | 21.7 (71.1) | 21.8 (71.2) | 18.8 (65.8) | 15.1 (59.2) | 10.3 (50.5) | 7.6 (45.7) | 13.6 (56.5) |
| Average precipitation mm (inches) | 43.8 (1.72) | 36.3 (1.43) | 36.3 (1.43) | 41.8 (1.65) | 49.7 (1.96) | 37.2 (1.46) | 25.2 (0.99) | 49.3 (1.94) | 78.4 (3.09) | 80.9 (3.19) | 54.4 (2.14) | 41.2 (1.62) | 575 (22.6) |
| Average precipitation days (≥ 0.1 mm) | 7.8 | 7.3 | 7.5 | 8.7 | 7.6 | 4.4 | 3.8 | 4.8 | 7.0 | 6.7 | 6.5 | 4.0 | 76 |
| Average relative humidity (%) | 67 | 65 | 69 | 72 | 73 | 72 | 73 | 73 | 72 | 73 | 69 | 68 | 70 |
Source: MeteoBDN (1981–2010, 2009–2017 for precipitation days and humidity)

== Demographics ==
Historical population
| Year | Pop. | ±% |
|---|---|---|
| 1842 | 3,781 | — |
| 1857 | 10,485 | +177.3% |
| 1877 | 13,755 | +31.2% |
| 1887 | 15,885 | +15.5% |
| 1900 | 19,254 | +21.2% |
| 1910 | 20,985 | +9.0% |
| 1920 | 29,092 | +38.6% |
| 1930 | 42,230 | +45.2% |
| 1940 | 48,520 | +14.9% |
| 1950 | 60,133 | +23.9% |
| 1960 | 92,985 | +54.6% |
| 1970 | 163,374 | +75.7% |
| 1981 | 229,780 | +40.6% |
| 1991 | 218,725 | −4.8% |
| 2001 | 205,836 | −5.9% |
| 2011 | 219,241 | +6.5% |
| 2021 | 221,750 | +1.1% |
Source: INE

As of 2025, the population is 230,642, of which 49.3% are males, and 50.7% are females. Minors make up 17.4% of the population, and seniors make up 19.9%.

=== Immigration ===
As of 2025, immigrants make up 24.1% of the population. The 5 largest foreign countries of birth are Pakistan, Morocco, Ecuador, China, and Colombia.

Foreign population by country of birth (2025)
| Country | Population |
|---|---|
| Pakistan | 9,374 |
| Morocco | 6,233 |
| Ecuador | 3,785 |
| China | 3,713 |
| Colombia | 3,639 |
| Honduras | 3,051 |
| Peru | 2,419 |
| Venezuela | 2,042 |
| Argentina | 2,032 |
| India | 1,693 |
| Bolivia | 1,655 |
| Dominican Republic | 1,200 |
| Ukraine | 1,184 |
| Russia | 1,058 |
| Paraguay | 865 |

== Administrative divisions ==
Badalona has 34 neighbourhoods and 6 districts. Before the 20th century, the municipality was divided in 5 traditional quarters known as la Sagrera, Llefià, Sistrells, Canyet and Pomar. However, due to the growth of the population during the 20th century, the city was administratively divided into more neighbourhoods and new districts grouping each one several of them. The current division is dated of 1980, except for a modification in 2011 which reduced the districts from 8 to 6. The districts and their neighbourhoods are as follows:

- District 1: Canyadó, Casagemes, Centre, Coll i Pujol, Dalt de la Vila, El Manresà and El Progrés.
- District 2: Montigalà (western section), Nova Lloreda, Sant Crist de Can Cabanyes, Sistrells, La Pau and Puigfred.
- District 3: Montigalà (eastern section), Canyet, Mas Ram, Bufalà, Pomar, Pomar de Dalt, Bonavista, Les Guixeres and Morera.
- District 4: La Salut, Sant Antoni de Llefià, Sant Joan de Llefià, Sant Mori de Llefià.
- District 5: Gorg, La Mora, Congrés, Can Claris and El Raval.
- District 6: Artigues, El Remei and Sant Roc.

== Culture ==
In May, in occasion of the celebration of Saint Anastasi, the patron saint of Badalona, activities and festivals are organized all around the city. The most important celebration takes place the day before Saint Anastasi Day when, at night, people gather at the maritime promenade to participate in the popular Cremada del Dimoni (Devil-Burning)--similar to the famous Valencian Falles. During these festivities, the Badalona giants are exhibited.

== Economy ==
The economy of Badalona is mainly based on the service sector, although traditionally it was an important industrial centre. The primary sector as agriculture and fishing were also remarkable. However, those activities declined throughout the 20th century. In 2017 Badalona's GDP worth 4.122,9 million Euros, of which 3.020 (79,9%) corresponds to services, 501,8 to industry (13,3%), to construction (6,9%) and a tiny part (less than 1%) to agriculture.

About the primary sector, in the one hand since 2004, agriculture in Badalona basically consists only of the vineyards of the masia of Can Coll, and more recently, since 2019, vineyards haven been planted next to the monastery Sant Jeroni de la Murtra by a cooperative. Both farms are in the neighbourhood of Canyet. Since 2012 Badalona is part of Alella DO. On the other hand, fishing is a residual sector, the lack of a port in the city until 2005 made the fishers going to work to other ports like Barcelona, Vilanova i la Geltrú or Blanes. The port, managed by Marina Badalona, is dedicated mainly to marina, however it also has a fishing part and a fish market, but there are few fishers nowadays.

Industry was a key sector in Badalona for many years, since the arrival of the train in 1848. The old village grew and a lot of factories from different sectors (chemical, metallurgical, food and liquors, etc.) established themselves. This all changed during the last decades of the 20th century, when many industries left the city because of their negative environmental impact due to contamination. Since then Badalona has developed several specific industrial zones, such as Les Guixeres, where the city council constructed the Badalona International Business Center, with the aim of improving the services, external projection, exchanges and competitiveness in the European and American market of the companies based in Badalona. The main sectors are microelectronics and robotics, followed by packaging and aerosols, textile machinery and industrial molds.

== Tourism ==
Badalona is popular stop for tourists. The city has its own touristic route featuring the old town of Dalt de la Vila with stops in the Church of Santa Maria, the Old Tower and some medieval streets, besides some modernist houses. From there and following Costa street, it shows the Baix a Mar or Centre area, which concentrates a wide range of shops, restaurants, bars, and cafes. Key tourist stops include:

- Monastery of Sant Jeroni de la Murtra.
- Old Roman Baetulo, in the Museum of Badalona.
- Iberian settlement of turó d'en Boscà.
- City beach.
- Annual Burning of the Devil during Festes de Maig.

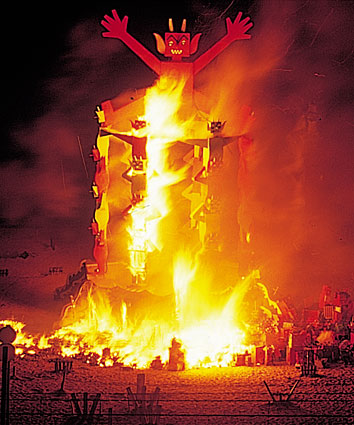
Cremada del Dimoni

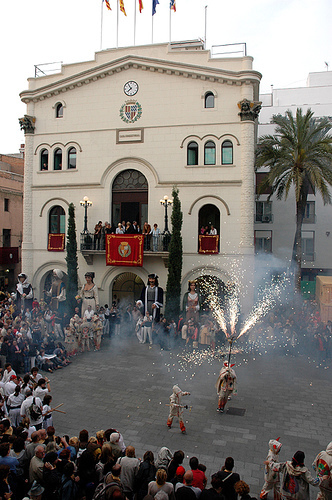
Plaça de la vila

== Transport ==
Badalona has a Renfe train station R1 from Barcelona to Mataró – Blanes, as well as a harbour. There are also links to Barcelona via the Barcelona Metropolitan Transport (TMB) metro (underground) and bus system, as well as the Trambesòs line.

== Sport ==
The city's most important sport complex is the Palau Municipal d'Esports de Badalona (Municipal Sports Palace), which won the Mies Van der Rohe award in 1992. The Palace was the setting for basketball competition during the Olympic Games in 1992. Nowadays, it is home of the basketball team from Badalona, Joventut Badalona, also known as la Penya. This place will also be the centre of the Badalona Capital Europea del Bàsquet, which is intended to be a theme park celebrating basketball – with a basketball museum, shopping center, cinemas, basketball courts, a harbour, indoor karting and more activities.

== Notable people ==
- Llorenç Brunet (1873–1939), illustrator
- Joan Amigó (1875–1959), architect
- Jordi Dauder (1938–2011), actor
- Julià de Jòdar i Muñoz (born 1942), writer
- Enric Juliana (born 1956), journalist
- Lluïsa Cunillé (born 1961), playwright
- Daniel Sirera (born 1967), politician
- Jorge Javier Vázquez (born 1970), TV personality
- Melani Olivares (born 1973), actress
- Juan Magán (born 1978), DJ and singer
- Pau Ribas (born 1987), basketball player
- Cristina Agüera Gago (born 1990), politician
- Mireia Belmonte (born 1990), swimmer
- Luis García (born 1978), footballer
- Héctor Bellerín (born 1995), footballer
- Celia Segura (born 2007) footballer
- Jordi Fernández (born 1982), basketball coach

== See also ==
- CF Badalona (Spanish League – 2nd division)
- Institute of Predictive and Personalized Medicine of Cancer
- Joventut Badalona (basketball team) in Liga ACB
- Palau Municipal d'Esports de Badalona (Olympic basketball seat '92)
