= Canyet =

District of Badalona, Barcelona, Spain

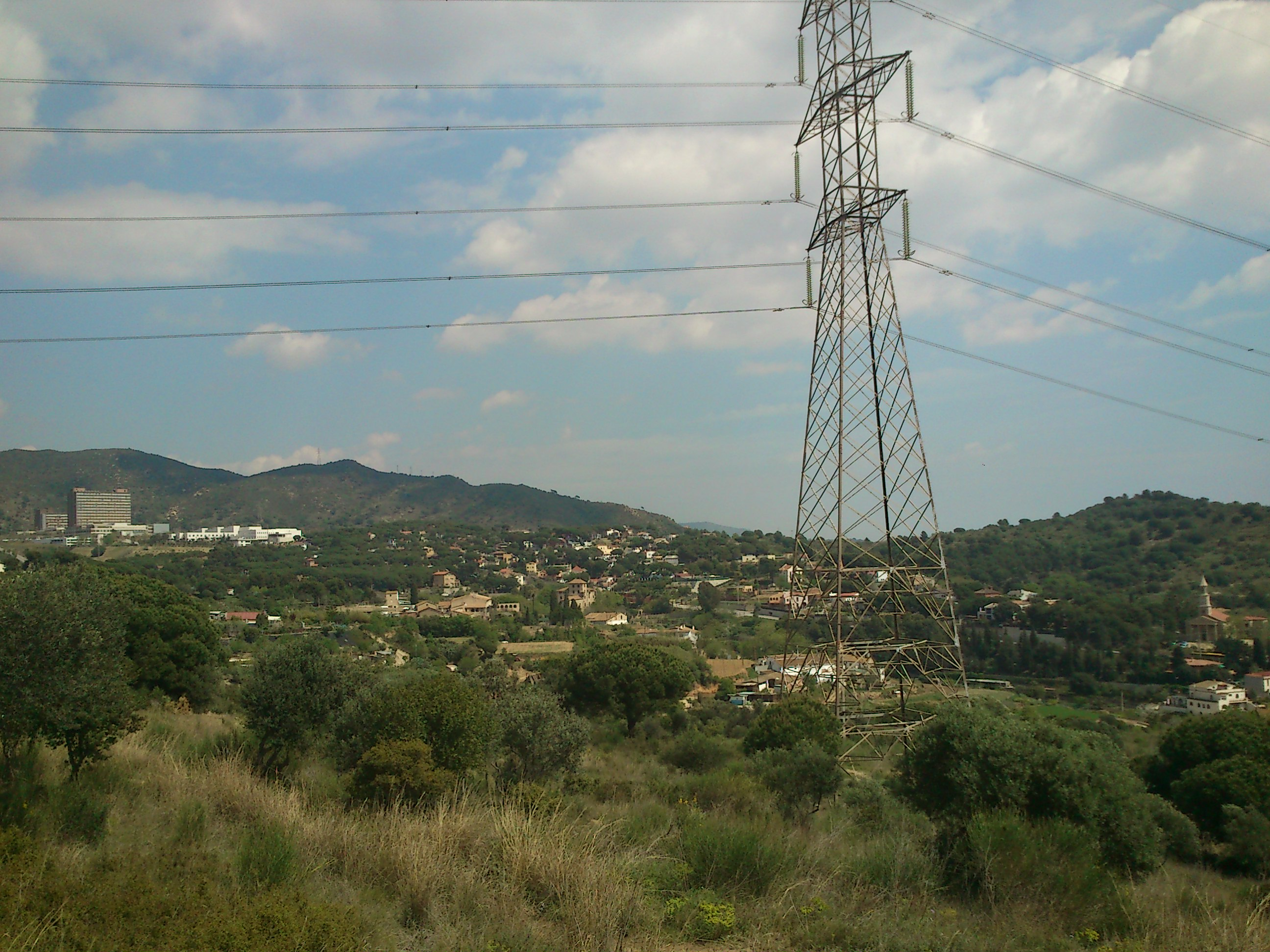
Partial view of the valley and the neighborhood of Canyet; you can see the hospital of Can Ruti on the left, and the parish of Sant Crist on the right.

Canyet is a district of Badalona that occupies the northern end of the municipality.

== Limits ==
The current limits approved by the Town Hall in 1980 are: riera de Canyet turning westwards by the road from Can Mora to the municipal term of Santa Coloma de Gramenet, limit of this term and that of Montcada y Reixac, limit with San Fausto de Campcentellas, Riera de Pomar, Turó d'en Boscà y Calle Ferrater.

== Basic data ==
- Is a district biggest of Badalona with 562.78 ha
- Its population is 565 (2002) representing only 0.3% of the total of Badalona

== Urban area ==
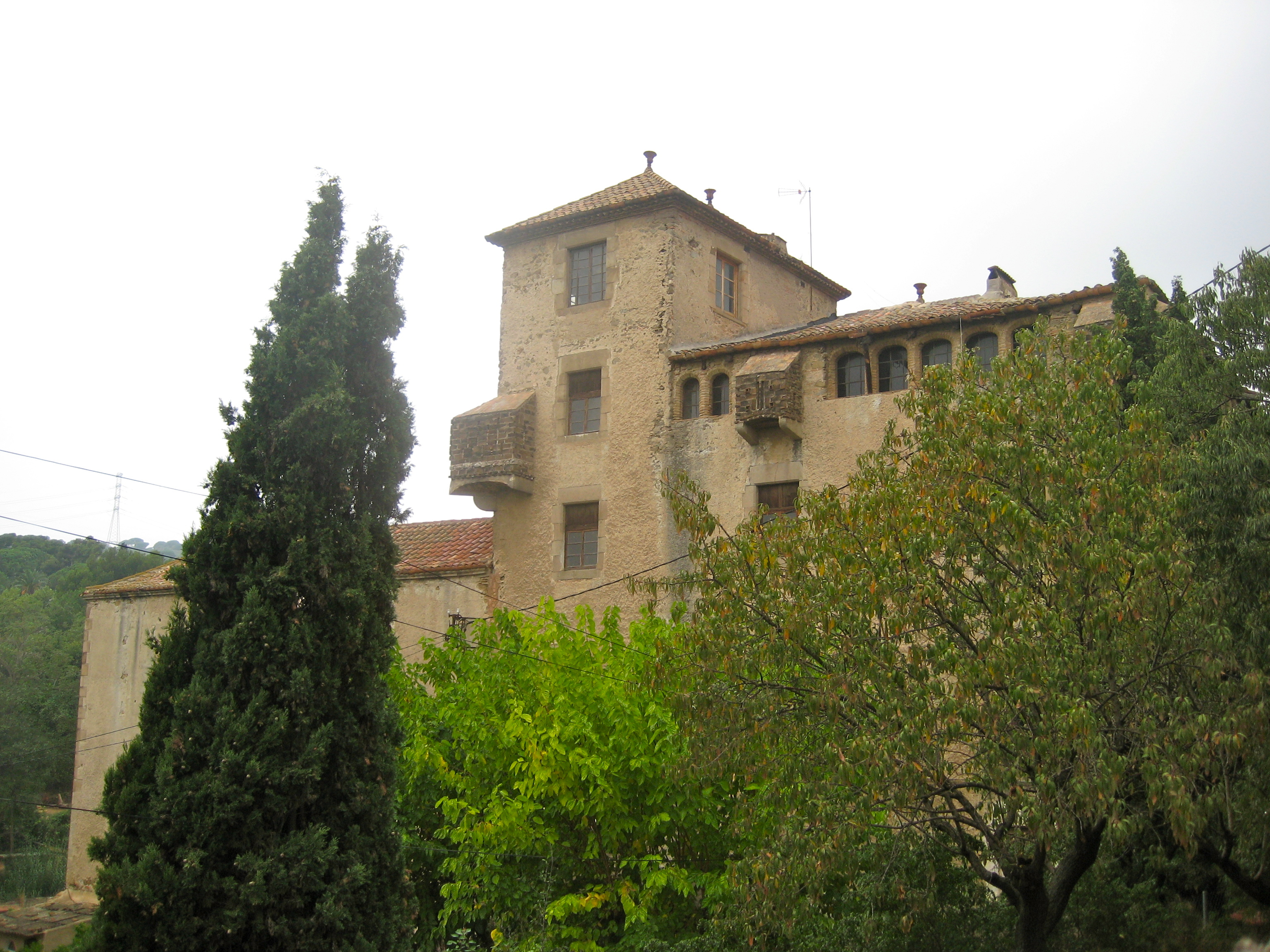
Tower Codina

The neighborhood is formed by a group of isolated typical farms and a more modern nuclei formed from constructions for vacationers. These summer resorts began in the 1920s and ended up becoming the first residences.

== Heritage ==
The good conservation of the farms is the reason that 12 of them are included in the special Plan of protection of the historical heritage of Badalona. They are the farmhouses of the Torre Codina, Can Trons, Can Miravitges, Can Ferrater, Ca l'Arquer, Mas Boscà, Can Butinyà, Can Mora, Mas Amigó, Mas Oliver and Cal Dimoni. One of these houses is deemed of particular significance, Can Pujol.

Among the summer resorts converted into first residences are the colony of Sant Antoni, in the surroundings of Can Campmany; the Sant Jaume colony, in the surroundings of the Mas Oliver; and the Sant Jordi colony, in the surroundings of the Codina Tower.

The most important monument of the neighborhood is the Monastery of San Jerónimo de la Murtra.
