= Plaza (surname) =

- The coat of arms of Galo Plaza as Knight Grand Cross of the Order of Isabella the Catholic
- Languages: Spanish, Filipino, English

Origin
- Language: Spanish
- Meaning: (relating to a) plaza
- Region of origin: Basque Country

Other names
- Alternative spelling: Plasa; Plassa; Plaça
- Variant forms: De la Plaza; La Plaza
- Cognates: Piazza, Place
- Related names: Plazaola; Plazaechea; Plazas
- See also: La Placa, Laplace

Plaza (Spanish pronunciation: [ˈplaθa]; Latin American Spanish pronunciation: [ˈplasa]; Filipino pronunciation: [ˈplasa]; English: /ˈplɑːzə/; Basque pronunciation: [pla.s̻a]) is a Spanish-language surname that is understood to originate in the Basque Country. It is common in this area, and has spread across Spain as well as Latin America and the Philippines, including prominent political families.

== Origin ==
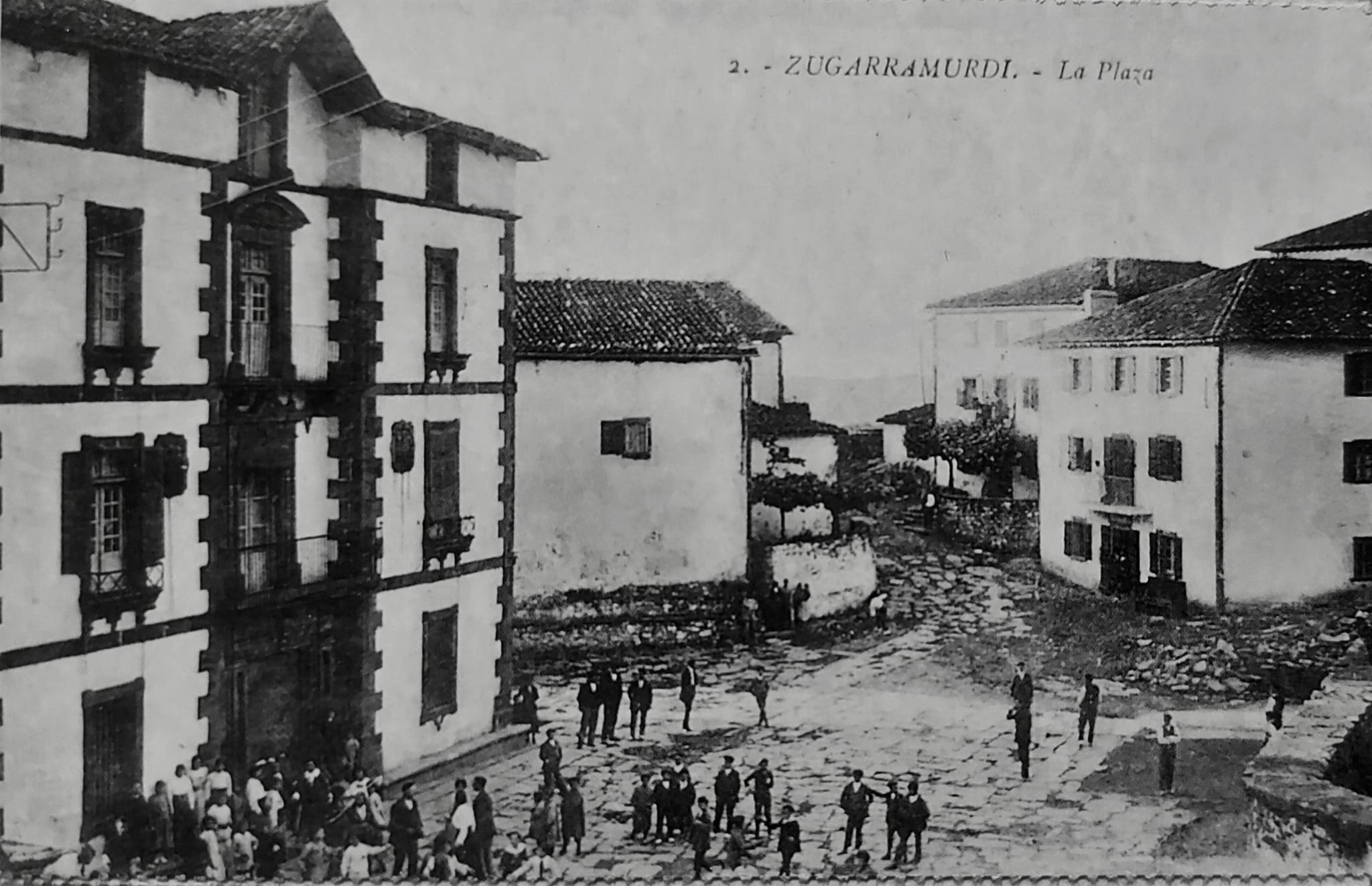
La Plaza of Zugarramurdi in 1918

The surname Plaza originates in Spain. It can derive from the common noun plaza (English: town square) as a toponymic surname. José Godoy Alcántara defined De la Plaza as a habitational surname, to identify someone within a town by a local feature near which they lived. In their dictionary, Conto and Isaza wrote of Plaza as an example of a common noun becoming a surname. Juan Sebastián Elián noted that the word "plaza" also came to refer to markets and fairs (that took place in specific plazas), which could be alluded to when taken as a surname. The related name Plazaola originally referred to the plaza of a ferrería (English: forge). S. C. Mora Monroy cited Plaza as a surname of economic terminology, along with Mercado (market) and Feria (fair). Plaza is a well-known surname in the Basque country, from where it is understood to originate.

Research for the University of the Basque Country explained that, besides instances of the name deriving from the common noun, Plaza can be an oeconym from specific locations in the Basque country, pointing to the Plaza family house of Zugarramurdi, in Navarre, and a neighborhood of nearby Sare, in Labourd. Traditionally in the Basque country, individuals could become known by oeconyms rather than surnames. Jorge de Montemor wrote that the surname Plaza originated primitively in "the mountains of Aragon" before this family settled in the Navarre merindad of Estella, with the one house branching across Spain, while Elián wrote that the name was first known in Balmaseda in the Basque region of Biscay before extending to Navarre and Aragon, and then the rest of the Iberian Peninsula. As there are many family lines with the name, there are multiple coats of arms.

Even as a Basque surname, Plaza (and the related Plazaola) almost certainly comes from the Spanish language. Luis Mari Mujika wrote in 1992 that folkloric Basque language etymologies, suggesting that the names derive from a pla- ideophone, were "fanciful". The Spanish word comes from Latin platea, with the meaning of 'broad street' or 'public square', which itself ultimately came from Greek πλατεῖα (ὁδός) plateia (hodos).

== People ==
Notable people with the surname include:

- Alicia Plaza, Venezuelan actress
- Ambrosio Plaza, Venezuelan soldier
- Antonio Plaza, Spanish engineer
- Aubrey Plaza, American actress and comedian
- Bárbara Plaza, Spanish rhythmic gymnast
- Bartolomé de la Plaza, Spanish Catholic prelate
- Brandon Plaza, Mexican taekwondo athlete
- Braulio Rodríguez Plaza, Spanish Catholic prelate
- Daniel Plaza, Spanish race walker
- David Sandoval Plaza, Chilean politician
- David Plaza, Spanish cyclist
- Diana Plaza, Spanish gymnast
- Eber Pérez Plaza, Argentine politician
- Eduardo Plaza, Chilean writer
- Fernando Plaza, Spanish cyclist
- Ignacio Plaza Jiménez, Spanish handball player
- Inés Plaza, Spanish politician
- Javier de la Plaza, Spanish sailor
- Joan Plaza, Spanish basketball coach
- José Antonio Plaza, Spanish journalist
- Juan Bautista Plaza, Venezuelan composer
- Juan de la Plaza, Spanish Jesuit missionary
- Luis García Plaza, Spanish football manager
- Manuel Plaza, Chilean runner
- Marco Plaza, Chilean footballer
- Mélissa Plaza, French footballer
- Paco Plaza, Spanish filmmaker
- Raymond Plaza, French cyclist
- René Meléndez Plaza, Chilean footballer
- Ron Plaza, American baseball manager
- Rubén Plaza, Spanish cyclist
- Santiago Plaza, Mexican sprinter
- Sebastián Méndez Plaza, Chilean footballer
- Stéphane Plaza, French television presenter
- Stiven Plaza, Ecuadorian footballer
- Tolo Plaza, Spanish footballer
- Victorino de la Plaza, Argentine politician and former President of Argentina
- Willis Plaza, Trinidadian footballer
- Members of the Ecuadorian political family:
  - Galo Plaza, Ecuadorian politician and former President of Ecuador
  - Leónidas Plaza, Ecuadorian politician and former President of Ecuador, father of Galo
  - María José Plaza, Ecuadorian politician, granddaughter of Galo
- Members of the Filipino Plaza political family:
  - Democrito Plaza, Filipino politician, patriarch of the Plaza political clan
  - Eddiebong Plaza, Filipino politician, son of Democrito and Valentina
  - Maria Valentina Plaza, Filipino politician, daughter of Democrito and Valentina
  - Rodolfo Plaza, Filipino politician, son of Democrito and Valentina
- Some musicians have also used a stage name with the surname Plaza:
  - Capo Plaza, Italian rapper
  - Lotus Plaza, American musician
  - Martin Plaza, Australian musician

== See also ==
- Maciej Płaza, Polish writer with a similarly-rendered surname
