= P4P =

P4P may refer to:

- Ring Magazine pound for pound
- Pay for performance (disambiguation), in health care, human resources, advertising, etc.
- Pay for perks, a business model in online games where players can purchase virtual assets.
- Pay for placement, an advertising method in which relevant ads are placed next to results from a search engine.
- Pound for pound, a term in combat sports used to describe a fighter's value in relation to fighters in other weight classes.
- Proactive network Provider Participation for P2P, a means for internet providers to optimize Peer-to-peer (P2P) traffic flow.
- Purchase for Progress, a United Nations World Food Programme initiative.
- Serosorting, otherwise known as "Poz4Poz" or "Poz4Play".
- Pay-for-Play, exchange of money for the privilege to engage in a specific activity.
- Pedals for Progress, a non-profit organization collecting bicycles and sewing machines.

== See also ==
- P2P (disambiguation)
