= Carnivals from the Basque Country =

Carnivals in the Basque Country are celebrated in eleven different villages and cities and they are usually lively and colourful celebrations. This way of celebrating carnivals has attracted attention all over Europe. They are associated with the old tradition of the Basque Country and they have been celebrated in different ways since the age of the Roman Empire. Each village or city has a typical character and all the celebrations are associated with this character. They have had a lot of changes over the years in the costumes, rituals, meanings, and ways to celebrate them. They have been also denounced several times, for example by Franco's dictatorship. But they always have been a very important part of the Basque culture and it is also a symbol of it.

== Main characters ==
=== Markitos ===
This character is from Zalduondo (Alava). He is a doll dressed in a black suit and a tie. On the Sunday of carnivals, he appears on the main street of the village riding a donkey and they take them to a castle. Here, they take him down from the donkey and they hang him from a six-meter stick for some hours. In the afternoon, a noisy procession appears. Here the preacher and the street cleaner come in the leading position. Then an old couple appears. These are the parents of Markitos, and a single person does the characters of both of them. And after them, other different characters. The last ones take Markitos down, and they put him in a cart. They drive this cart to a court wall and here the preacher judges Markitos. He says that he has to be killed, so people take the doll and they burn him.

=== Kotilungorriak ===
This character is typical of Uztaritz. The celebration lasts four days. The first three days, people dressed up as different characters, go home to home asking and there are also some parades during these three days. On these parades appear different characters like Kaskarot, Ponpiera, and Kotilungorria. This last one is the most important. Normally, there are only two. They wear a red skirt over some white trousers. They wear also a white jacket and a typical apron. On their hands, they wear a stick with a cow tail hanged. On their head, they wear a long pyramidal hut and their face is covered by red clothing. This character is usually scaring children.

=== Atorrak ===
They are a group of men and boys from Mundaka who go out to the street on the Sunday of Carnivals and they play music and they sing. They are dressed in white clothes, except the director of the band. Every year, they compose a new song and after going around the village, they go to the harbor. This is the best part of their show.

=== Joaldunak ===
The Joaldunak are the protagonists from the Ituren and Zubieta carnivals in Navarre which are held on the Monday and Tuesday after the last Sunday in January. One of the notable characteristics of the Joaldunak is that they wear a pair of large cowbells tied tightly around their waist which they ring in a loud, rhythmic, and atavistic dirge. They also wear a tall conical hat with coloured ribbons and a thick sheepskin over their shoulders. In their hands they hold a horse hair whip which they flick in front of them as they march. On the Monday of carnivals, a troupe of Joaldunak from Zubieta, visit the village of Ituren where they are greeted by the locals who are dressed up as witches and demons. There is then a grand feast in Ituren village hall. On Tuesday morning, a troupe of Joaldunak from Ituren then march over to Zubieta where they are greeted by the villagers of Zubieta who are also dressed as demons and witches. Afterwards, there is a large feast in Ituren village hall. The Joaldunak and the carnivals in Ituren and Zubieta have attracted much anthropological interest and some argue that they are the oldest pagan, pre-indoeuropean carnivals in Europe.

=== Zalmantzain ===
This is the protagonist of the dance of the Maskarada from Zuberoa, which lasts from the start of the carnivals and ends on Tuesday. They celebrate it by doing a show. In this shoe, there are two different groups: the black ones and the red ones. The red ones are the characters that are elegantly and cleanly dressed (we can find Zalmantzain in this group). And the black ones are dressed as poor people. During the procession along the village, the black ones tried to annoy the red ones. When they arrive at the main square the red ones dance typical basque dances.

=== Miel Otxin ===
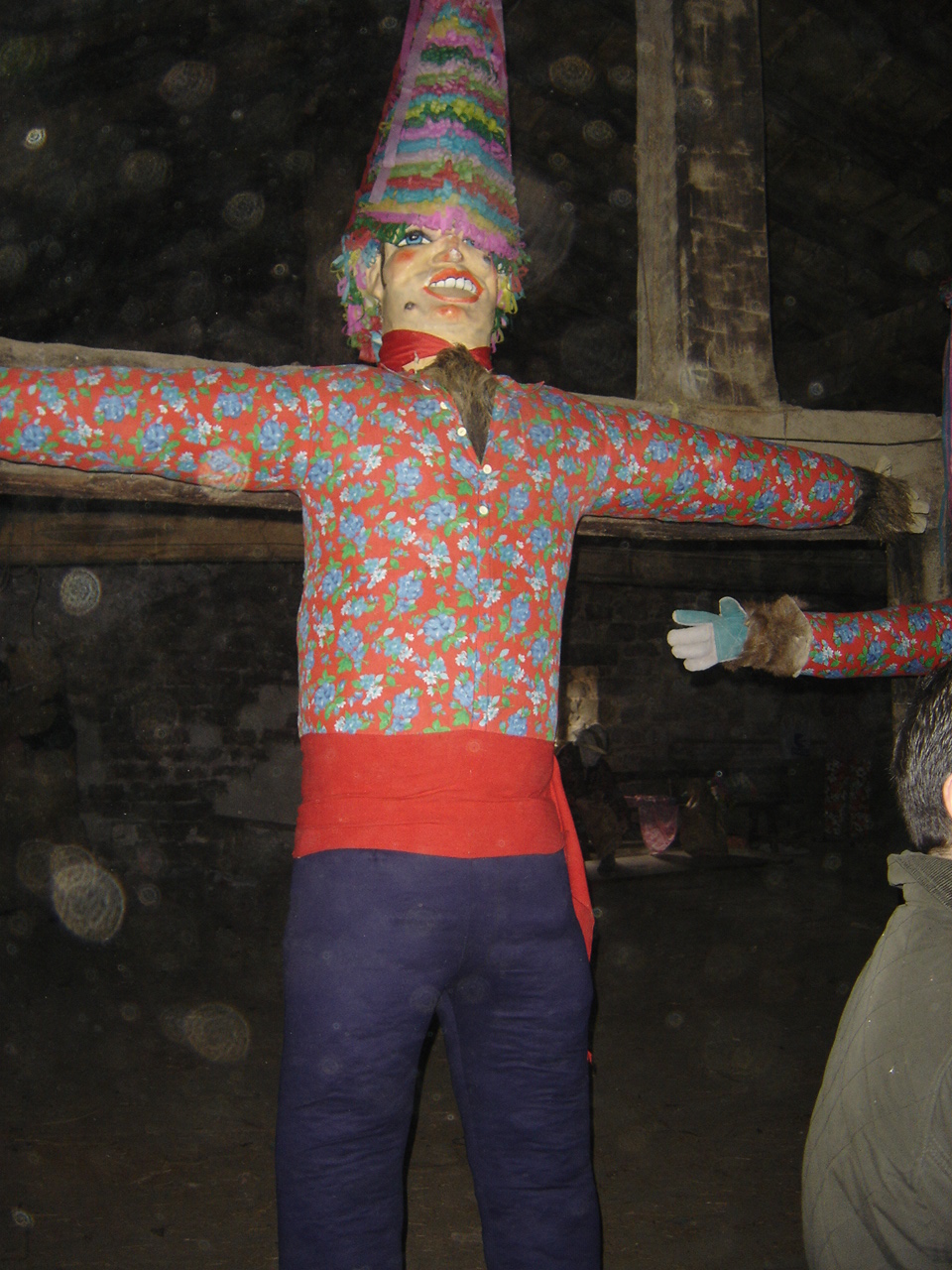
The Miel Otxin figure.

This is one of the principal characters of the carnivals on Monday and Tuesday in Lantz. With him, other ones appear like Ziripot, Zaldiko, and Txatxoa. Miel Otxin is a three-meter-tall doll made of straw. A Txatxo takes him on his shoulders during the celebrations. Zaldiko is a centaur, a man dressed up as a horse. The Txatxos have different ways of dressing up. But they are always colorful and they wear a broom in their hands, their face covered, and a colorful conical hut. The celebration starts on Monday. All these characters go out to the street. The Txatxos go around singing and dancing. Zaldiko tries to throw Ziripot and this one falls several times because he is a little bit clumsy. On Tuesday, the only character that goes out is Miel Otxin. The Txatxos carry him to the main square and here they judge him. They shoot him twice and they kill him. After that, they cut his body into pieces and they burn him.
