= List of ideophones in Basque =

This article is list of ideophones in Basque language based on Ibarretxe-Antuñano's (2006) trilingual dictionary Hizkuntzaren Bihotzean - Euskal Onomatopeien Hiztegia.

== A ==
- abaaba — expression for toddling children and in lullabies
- abo-abo — sleep
- abu-abu — go for a walk
- afa — expression of happiness
- aiba! — gasp of astonishment
- aida-aida — cattle
- aikolo-maikolo— indecisive
- aiku-maiku — indecision.
- akuilu-makuilu — stilts
- ani-ani — walk, go for a walk
- antxi-antxika — running
- apa-apa — walking (especially, a little kid).
- apapa — toddle over here.
- apapanturi — drowsy sleepy man
- apar — foam, spray, surf
- aput — expression of disapproval
- araust — call for challenge
- arlote — homeless
- armi-arma — spider
- arra-arra — gush out
- arre — gee up!
- arret-zarret — zigzag.
- asa! — cry to start moving
- asa-asa — without too many clothes.
- atx — ouch; call for pigs.
- atxi-atxi — to run.
- au-au — bark of a small dog
- auk — call for geese
- aup — expression to get up
- aupi — expression of happiness
- ausk — sound of bite
- auzi-mauzi — quarrel, problem.
- axi — expression to set the dog on somebody
- axut — call for a challenge
- azur-mazurrak — leftovers

== B ==
- bala-bala — from person to person; bluntly.
- balan-balan — move clumsily.
- bal-bal — hard boiling sound.
- ban-ban — industrious, proud, non-stop.
- bar-bar — sound of bubbling water; rhythmic falling of a light body.
- barra-barra — a great deal, a lot, amply, abundantly, plentifully.
- barrast — sound of ripping
- barristi-barrasta — move quickly.
- bat-bat — wholly, completely.
- bedera-bedera — profusely (especially grain falling and money spending).
- beilo-beilo — tipsy, slightly drunk.
- ber-ber — equally, no matter.
- bera-bera — to walk by oneself.
- berrinba-barranba — clumsy.
- bi-bi — call for cats.
- biguin-miguin — flattery.
- bil-bil — bubble, rounded.
- biliki-balaka — swinging, teetering.
- bilin-balan — tumbling, turning over.
- bilin-bolan — stagger, totter, reel.
- bilist-balast — slip, sway, rocking.
- bill-bill — piled up.
- bilo-biloka — women's fight (tearing hair out)
- binbili-bonbolo — gently.
- bir-bor — borborygmus; any rumbling noise
- bir-bir — around.
- biri-biri — call for ducks.
- birra-barra — suddenly.
- birri-barra — to spread.
- birrin-birrin — buzzing.
- bitx-bitx — wee wee, pee pee.
- bix-bixean — throwing the ball to one another.
- bixilli-baxalla — to be naughty.
- blasta-blasta — melt down.
- blei-blei — soaked.
- bli-bli — swollen.
- bolo-bolo — spreading.
- bolon-bolon — sleeping.
- bon-bon — big spending.
- bor-bor — gushing, spurting.
- brenk — precipitous mountain.
- brika-brika — stride purposefully.
- brin-brau — walk hastily.
- bris-bris — twinkle, glitter.
- briu-brau — walk very fast.
- bru-bru — rumour.
- bun-bun — waste.
- burrun-burrun — bumble bee humming.

== D ==
- da-da — knock the door.
- dai-dai — going in a hurry.
- dal-dal — tremble.
- danba-danba — insistently, on and on.
- dank — tap, stroke
- dapa — have an idea suddenly.
- dar-dar — trembling.
- di-da — proceed drastically
- dil-dil — light tremble.
- dinbirri-danbarra — continuous drag.
- din-din — with difficulty.
- dir-dir — the sound of something sparkling or shiny.
- dis-dis — sparkle, sunbeam, gleam.
- diz-diz — sparkle, glow (stars).
- doi-doi — barely, hardly.
- draga-draga — in big gulps.
- drak — to stop suddenly.
- draka-draka — trot.
- drasta-drasta — count or pay by giving the money coin by coin.
- drungun-drungun — clumsily drink in big gulps.
- dui-dui — exactly
- dxxi — sound of a firework being launched.

=== DZ ===
- dzast — throw something and put it into an opening or a corner.
- dzat — not to bounce the ball as a result of hitting the angle.
- dzauan-dzauan — walk slowly and swinging.
- dziko — the sound of hitting somebody in the chest.
- dzirrin-dzarran — sawing sound, squeak.
- dzirt-dzart — bim bam.
- dzist — gushing out water

== E ==
- eleka-meleka — chattering.
- enpi-enpi — walk with difficulty, trudge.
- enuxu-banuxu — slow at walking
- epen-epen — keep up with difficulty.
- erotetan-peroretan — without thinking
- erran-merran — gossiping.
- erre-merre — articulating the sound R wrongly
- esti — yaa! (cattle)
- estu-estu — nervously.
- et-et-et — exclamation used when somebody is in a difficult situation or to attract attention.
- etsi-etsian — as a last resort.
- eurt! — yaa! (cattle).

== F ==
- fara-fara — light motion (sails, birds, sweat running down...)
- farfal — very full dress
- far-fan — frivolous.
- far-far — rustling.
- farran-farran — spin clumsily.
- fistin-fastan — walk angrily.
- fil-fil-fil — fall down in circles and slowly.
- fili-fala — fray.
- fir-fir — murmur.
- firi-firi — soft breeze.
- firik-firiki — softly.
- firin-faran — walk aimlessly.
- firiri — rotative motion of an object thrown in the air.
- firri-farra — foolishly.
- fixti-faxta — stomp around in a rage.
- flisk-flask — crack, crackle, crash.
- fliu-fliu — long wave.
- flost — fall into water.
- fri-fri — whoosh, go across the air fast
- frink — not to keep one's word
- furra — call for hens.
- furrunta — sound the spinning wheel.

== G ==
- gal-gal — boiling, bubbling, gushing out.
- gan-gun — lazy person.
- gara-gara — caw, croak, honk.
- garamanazal — mature woman ready to marry the first one to appear.
- garra-garra — rolling around.
- geri-geri — groping in the dark.
- gexa-mexa — weak.
- gilin-gilin — sound of a cowbell.
- glaska-glaska — sound of gnawing.
- gli-gli — water murmur.
- glin-glan — wine poured in a bottle.
- glaska-glaska — sound of cutting hair.
- glok — to get upset stomach from something.
- glu-glu — swallow.
- gori-gori — red-hot, burning, incandescent.
- grik-grak — bone crackling.

== H ==
- hanka-hanka — one after another
- hapa-hapa — pant (breath with difficulty).
- harrikalanka — carry stones
- hasi-masi — basics, rudiments.
- hauka-mauka — profusely eating.
- hautsi-mautsi — from time to time.
- hezur-mezur — bits and scraps of bones and pork.
- hikili-mikili-klik — drink up in a gulp
- hinki-hanku — hobbling.
- hirrun-harrun — bickering.

== I ==
- ia-ia — almost.
- igiri-bigiri — otter.
- iji-aja — ridicule.
- ika-mika — quarrel, argument.
- ikertu-mikertu — hunt around for.
- ikusi-makusi — "I Spy" game.
- ikusle-mirusle — voyeur.
- ilun-milun — growing dark.
- indura-mandura — indecisive man.
- ingili-angala — sig of disgust and sadness.
- ingura-mingura — beat about the bush.
- intzire-mintzire — complaint.
- ipi-apa — in great detail.
- ipin-apan — carefully.
- iritzi-miritzi — tittle-tattle.
- irra — call for pigeons.
- irri-borro — rotative motion, quick and confusing.
- irri-irri — mocking laugh.
- irri-kar-kar — guffaw.
- irri-marra — throw money in christening ceremonies
- irri-mirri — weak.
- irri-murri — mischievous smile
- irrintzi — whoop of joy typical of Basque shepherds when they are in the mountains, and of Basque people in general
- irri-orro — smudge.
- isilka-misilka — whispering.
- iski-miski — trivialities.
- ito-ito — a big hurry.
- itsu-itsu — blindly.
- itx-atx — not a word.
- ixil-mixil — secret conversation.
- ixo — shhh, hush.
- izka-mizka — chattering whispering.
- izkutu-mizkutu — mystery
- izt — oi, call for attention

== J ==
- jai-jai — expression of skepticism.
- jarrai-marrai — steps of a procedure.
- jauzi-mauzi — prancing.
- jin-jun — twangy.
- jitipiti-jatapata — crawl

== K ==
- kaiku — wooden bowl for milk.
- kainka — cry of pain (of dogs being hit)
- kakamilikuri — cockatoo
- kako-mako — cunning argument, trickery.
- kala-kala — rhythmical noise.
- kalaka — millstone.
- kali-kola — poppy, weed in wheat.
- kank — sound of bouncing ball in Jai-Alai
- kanu-kanu — little by little.
- kar-kar-kar — guffaw; ha-ha-ha.
- kask — jolt, screech.
- katx-katx — call for sheep and cows.
- kax-kax — rat-a-tat-tat.
- kaz-kaz — expression for keeping away a cat.
- keinu-meinu — gesture, wink.
- ker-ker — in a straight line.
- ki-ki — hen's hiccups.
- kil-kil — coward, intimidated.
- kikili-kakala — staggering astride.
- kiki-mako — twist of rivers.
- kikirriki — multicoloured.
- kili-kili — tickles.
- kili-kolo — wobbling; unsure.
- kili-mili — slip away.
- kilin-kilin — swords fighting sound.
- kil-kil — cricket sound.
- kinki-kanka — trudge.
- kinkili-mankala — keep up with difficulty.
- kinkinka — jumping or rolling on the ends of a wooden log that rolls down the hill.
- kirik — hide-and-seek game.
- kirka-kirka — in bites
- kir-kir — joy, jubilation.
- kirri-karra — frog sound, croak.
- kirri-kirri — gnashing of teeth.
- kirri-marro — articulating R sound wrongly.
- kinkirrinka — champagne
- kisket — latch.
- kiski — central part in leather balls.
- kiskili-maskili — with difficulty.
- kitzi-kitzi — rummage.
- kixkil — trinket.
- klak — sound of unstacking.
- klaska — wolf down.
- klax-klax — scissors' sound
- kli-kli — insect's flight.
- klik-klik — cut hair.
- kluk — stop out of tiredness.
- klun — sound of liquid in a bottle.
- klun-klan — cot sound, to rock.
- kokolo-mokoli — idiot.
- koko-meko — indecisive.
- kokoriko — squatting, crouching.
- konkela-kaskala — carry a boy astride.
- korrok — belch.
- krak-krak — get drunk
- krik — drink buzz; if said to somebody, it is an invitation to do so, if the other person accepts, this one must say krak.
- kri-kra — strumming.
- krink-krank — griding.
- krisk — sound of breaking small things.
- kriskitin — castanet, snap
- kuka — strawman.
- kuku-marro — flat corncake filled with green cheese.
- kukurruku — cock-a-doodle-doo
- kulike-mulike — kitchen job.
- kulu-mulu — trifling.
- kuluxka — nap, siesta, light sleep.
- kun — rhythmical sound of a cradle/cot
- kunku — doorstop.
- kuñkuñkuño — full of fruit.
- kurrik — exclamation used by children when playing
- kurrin — pig grunt, oink.
- kurrun-kurrun — call for pigs.
- kuse-kuse — that precise moment
- kus-kur — a person with hunched shoulders
- kzzz — set the animals on somebody

== L ==
- laba-laba — (game) blind man's bluff.
- lafa-lafa — sound of dog gnawing.
- lala — tasteless.
- langet — hefty man.
- lapa-lapa — slurp down.
- lapatx — small snowflake.
- laprast — slip, slide
- lauodrio-maudorio — praises and flatteries, suck up to somebody.
- lepa-leba — sound of rough sea, roar
- lele — naive; for kids: milk (not maternal).
- lelo — "the same old story".
- lili — flower.
- lirin-laran — singing softly to oneself.
- lir-lar — sun glitter over a field.
- liruli — bird trill.
- lolo — sleep.
- lui — windward.
- lulu — dummy.
- luza-muza — put somebody off.

== M ==
- maila-maila — slow and peacefully.
- mailo-mailo — little by little.
- makaka-orro — roar of oxen.
- ma-la — land dragged by a torrent.
- ma-ma — drinking water or liquid.
- mamo — lice and fleas.
- mamor — bug insect.
- mamu — ghost, boogeyman.
- mar-mar — whispering, mumbling.
- mara-mara — snow softly and continuously.
- maro-maro — gradually.
- marra-marra — gulp down making noises.
- marru — bellowing, howling.
- marru-marru — voraciously, greedily.
- masta-masta — kissing.
- matanta — sluggish.
- matxar — big lips.
- mauka-mauka — eating voraciously.
- meka — twangy.
- mela-mela — completely soaked.
- meleka-meleka — eat without appetite.
- merro — weak and thin.
- mist — not a word
- miu — finicky.
- miz-miz — call for cats.
- mokoka — scold.
- mulu-mulu — whisper.
- mur-mur — murmur of water.
- mutx — with one arm.

== N ==
- nahasi-nahasi — chaos, mess.
- nahaste-borraste — confusion, mess
- nahi-mahi — wish.
- nar-nar — dull ache.
- ne-ne — (kids) milk.
- nikiki-nakaka — irritate.
- nir-nir — twinkle.
- nirro — with half closed eyes
- nunu — wet nurse.

== Ñ ==
- ñaka — dirty trick.
- ñan-ñan — yum-yum, (kids) to eat.
- ña-ña — (kids) cheese; food.
- ña-ñi — offering but not giving.
- ñasta-ñasta — eating without appetite.
- ñika — wink
- ñiki-ñiki — sound of having sex.
- ñiku-ñaku — hitting a bit, fighting for fun.
- ñimiño — teeny-weeny.
- ñiñika — iris.
- ñirro-ñarro — short-sighted.
- ñiski-ñaska — chewing.

== O ==
- ok — indigestion.
- op — call for challenge; expression of anger.
- opa-opa — offering.
- ospa — out!
- otx — expression of pain when burned or stuck with a needle
- ozta-ozta — with great difficulty.

== P ==
- pafa-pafa — puffing.
- palast — swish.
- palax-palax — walk step by step.
- pal-pak — harmful animal.
- pan — shoot, bang.
- panpa-panpa — hit continuously.
- pan-par — show-off.
- pan-pin — doll.
- papa — corn or flour bread.
- para-para — slide, glide.
- par-par — gushing out.
- parra-zirri — forced smile.
- part — thrown an object at a short distance.
- peto-peto — pure.
- pil-pill — glub-glub, slowly boiling.
- pin-per — reverse, back.
- pinpilinpauxa — butterfly
- pinpili-panpala — favourite
- pinpirin — elegant
- piran-piran — spend money little by little.
- piri-para — continuous and hectic succession of things.
- pirri — diarrhoea.
- piro-piro — boy's game: throwing a ball.
- pirrita — tumble, rolling down.
- pla-pla — coat (food, with egg and flour).
- plaust — sound of a heavy object falling.
- pli-pla — boom (fireworks).
- porrot — breakdown, failure.
- pottolo — chubby.
- prapapa-prapapa — speak quickly and continuously.
- pu — yuck!
- pulunp — splash.
- punpaka — bouncing.
- pupu — pain, hurt.
- purpur — spill.
- purpurka — slid down a slope.
- purra-purra — in abundance.
- purrust — liquid spill.
- purrut — fart
- purruzt — get annoyed
- puskala-muskala — blow
- puskila-muskila — DIY, small jobs
- putin — kick of a harassed horse
- putz — blow

== R ==
- ringi-ranga — strode.

== S ==
- saka-saka — shove.
- saltsa-maltsa — jumble.
- saplast — thud.
- sapa-sapa — transparent.
- sarasta — great shock
- sartada — sudden action, incision
- sast — inserting one object into another
- sast edo xist — burst; sting.
- satean-satean — frequently
- sauka-sauka — devour.
- sigi-saga — come and go zig-zagging
- sik eta sak — sharply
- siki-saka — non stop.
- siltsi-saltsa — helter-skelter, bolt
- sina-mina — gesture
- sino-mino — ceremonious
- sirrin-sarran — sound of sew
- sits — moth
- sistil — poor in nutrients
- sistrin — rachitic
- siu-siu — mole's noise
- siztun-saztun — sew clumsily
- so — whoa!, voice to stop animals
- sorki-morki — sew clumsily; a rough patch.
- sost — suddenly

== T ==
- tafla-tafla — splish-splash, wade.
- tak — sound of not very audible noises (heartbeat, pocket watch...); touch, tap.
- taka — quick action; sudden stop.
- taka-maka — groping
- taka-taka — toddling, walk slowly, in short and quick steps
- takian-takian — frequently, constantly
- tak-tak — tick-tock, clock sound
- talapats — swish, sound of a liquid moving inside a pitcher
- talast-talast — water shaking in a container
- talat — wet
- talka — bump, hit
- tal-tal — walk from one place to another
- tanga-tanga — sound of drops
- tank eta tink — punctually
- tankart — bucket in boats for bailing out
- tanka-tanka — coin by coin; step by step; drop by drop; rhythmical noise.
- tanpa — sound of falling
- tanpa-tanpa — walk with irregular steps
- tanta — drop
- tantaka — dripping
- tantal — big man
- tapla — little jumps when galloping or trotting
- tarabala — sound of a person falling down into the floor
- trabalako — fall and roll down the floor
- taraska — brazen woman
- taratata — expression of skepticism
- taratulo — drill
- tarranpantan — frying pan
- tarranta — unpleasant sound.
- tarrantantan — sound of a cartwheel moving
- tarrapada — spillage
- tarras — sticky
- tarrat — sound of clothing ripping
- tarra-tarra — drag
- tarrita — in an agitated state; make somebody anger; agitate
- tart — snap (a robe)
- tartaka — knotty wood
- tarteka-marteka — in one's free moments; in intervals.
- tarteka-tarteka — once in a while
- taska-taska — cry profusely
- tast — scorn
- tas-tas — spanking
- tat — suddenly
- tata — sound of scratching
- tatal — stammering
- tatan — youngest child
- tati — offering but not giving
- tauki — nod (sleeping)
- tauki-mauki — hammering
- taunk — hammering sound
- taun-taun — large wave.
- teke-meke — provoking.
- telent-telent — stand doing nothing.
- tenk — halt, stop.
- tente — upright.
- terreil-merreil — rebel, uncontrolled, unbridled.
- terren-terren — stubbornly.
- terrest-merrest — in any way.
- ter-ter — slowly, little by little.
- ter-ter-ter — in a straight line.
- tete — doggy.
- tetele — idiot.
- tetele-metele — without thinking.
- tifli-tafla — beating.
- tiki-taka — little by little, step by step.
- tilingo — worn out.
- tin — clang, metal sound.
- tinki-tanka — gulp
- tinta-minta — small details
- tintin — pulse
- tintirriña — baby's bottle
- tipirri-taparra — run with difficulty
- tipi-tapa — pitter-patter
- tir — cicada's song
- tira-tole — at will
- tira! — c'mon!
- tiribili-tarabala — fall and roll down
- tirin-kintan — tinkling
- tirri — gnashing of teeth
- tirri-tarra — farting
- tirriki-tarraka — lagging, straggling
- tirrin — electric ring
- tirrist-tarrast — plod
- tirrit — say "no" in disgust
- tiruri-tiruriru — sound of flute
- to — hey! (addressing males)
- tonk — get upset stomach from something, overdose on
- topa — toast, cheers
- torro-torroka — leapfrog, children's game
- tou-tou — call for cows
- traka-traka — walk, trot
- trank — slam, bang [door closing]
- trapala-trapala — gallop
- trata — clumsy movement of the spinning top
- trikitixa — dance and music from the Basque Country
- triki-traka — walk rhythmically
- trikun-trakuntza — gipsy con
- tringili-trangala — rattle
- trinka-trinka — press too much
- triska-traskatu — fight tooth and nail
- trisket — doorknocker
- trist — instant
- truskul — man with a malformation who walks clumsily, running into people
- truxala — rain buckets (a lot)
- tuf — yuck! expression of revulsion
- tuju-tuju — cough!
- tululu — a combination of three cards of equal value in the card game 31
- tulut — plug
- tunpa — loud blow
- tunpaka — jump in the air
- turlututu — no way
- turrusta — waterfall, cascade
- tururu — whistle made of plants
- turuta — small bugle
- tut — not a thing

== TT ==
- tta — yuck! (expression of disgust)
- ttaka-ttaka — taking baby steps
- ttakun-ttakun — sound of txalaparta
- ttara-ttara — drag little by little
- ttattik — expression used when somebody is deceived
- ttatto — get off
- tteke-meke — provoking
- tteke-tteke — slowly and peacefully
- ttinttin — handbell sound
- ttinttinrrin — liquor
- ttipi-ttapa — small step by step
- ttitt — get dressed
- ttok-ttok-ttok — small person looking around for something
- ttoporro — deformed animal
- ttotta — eau-de-vie;
- ttu — spit
- ttuki-ttuki — objection
- ttulun-ttulun — take it easily
- ttun-ttun — Basque instrument from Soule, psaltery
- ttunttur — Basque mardi-gras characters in Ituren and Zubieta (joaldunak)
- ttuntturro — carnival hat, worn by joaldunak
- ttur-ttur — shit of sheep

== TX ==
- txa — stop tapping
- txago — keep upright (of children)
- txainpa — woman's cry
- txak — short step
- txangot — sultry, stuffy weather
- txanpa — fast rowing regatas
- txanpan — rock the boats on the waves
- txanpon — coin
- txantol — wooden cat, tap for barrels
- txantxa — joke
- txantxulin — reckless
- txapar — small person
- txaplast — play ducks and drakes
- txapla-txapla — splash about barefoot
- txarakal — empty nut
- txart — swipe
- txart-txart — punish
- txatan-txatan — every step
- txeia — call for women
- txetxe — small child
- txi — roast
- txikili-txakala — walk slowly but with a firm step
- txikli-txoklo — clog
- txiko — call for young donkeys
- txil — cry, say uncle
- txilin-txilinera — throw nuts one by one
- txil-txil — simmer, slowly boil
- txin — coin, money
- txint — not a word
- txin-txin — clinking of coins
- txintxirri — rattle
- txintxo — good, loyal
- txio — chirp, tweet
- txipli-txapla — splash about
- txiri — shaving
- txirikonkila — carry a baby astride
- txirki-mirki — to be crossed with somebody
- txirlo — skittle
- txirri-mirri — insecure person, busybody
- txirrin — bell, buzzer, ring
- txirrist — slide
- txirrista — slide, tobbogan, sled
- txirtxilatu — explode, tear to pieces
- txir-txir — frying crackle
- txirula — flute
- txiska — trample
- txiska-miskaka — look for sweets
- txistu — Basque flute
- txita — chick
- txil-txil — willy, wee-wee
- txitxiri-bitxiri — bits and pieces, trinket
- txitxirri-patxarra — informality
- txiz — wee, pee
- txo! — call for attention, addressing boys
- txonbo — dive, dipping one's head in the water
- txongil — drinking jug with spout and handle (see botijo)
- txontxongilo — puppet
- txora-txora — drive mad
- txort — fuck, screw
- txost — in card game, answer to txist
- txotx — expression used in sagardotegis when a barrel is to be opened
- txu — spit
- txun-txun — small drum
- txurrun — curl up
- txurrut — sip
- txurrute-murrute — pub crawl
- txut — ouch!
- txutxu-mutxuka — whispering, saying secrets

== TZ ==
- tzintz — mucus
- tzipi-tzapa — baby crawl
- tzir-tzil — loose thread; unimportant thing or person
- tzonbor — log (tree)
- tzurruntzuntzun — rickety rickety
- tzur-tzur — laugh sarcastically

== U ==
- ufa — puff, expression of sadness
- uka-muka — doubt
- ulu — howl
- um — expression of distrust
- urku-murku — be up to no good
- urra-urra — call for hens
- urrutaka-urrutaka — by bargaining
- usa — whoa! (stop oxen)
- utx — expression of pain and surprise
- utz — flatulence
- ux — call to move away hens
- uzkur-muzkur — idle

== X ==
- xa — whoa! (oxen)
- xafla — slap
- xafla-xafla — hit rhythmically
- xaha-xaha — get undressed and wash the clothes
- xapi — away! (for cats)
- xarrast — scratch
- xarrata — mice squeak
- xast — do something quickly
- xehe-mehe — incidentally, in detail
- xiliparta-xalaparta — making a racket, a row
- ximur-xamur — wrinkle a bit
- xingar — pork, pig's flesh
- xingola-mingola — zigzag
- xinta-minta — whimpering, whining
- xintxar — mist
- xiribiri — violin
- xiriko-miriko — tempting
- xiri-miri — drizzle
- xirimola — hurricane
- xirin — diarrhea
- xirmi-xarma — spell, charm
- xirriki-xarraka — plod
- xirrit — dripping
- xirrizta — cry of pain
- xirro-marro — shepherd's game with six pebbles
- xirti-xarta — whipping
- xirto — pun, play of words
- xirurika — whoosh
- xist — quickly; instant
- xiu-xiu — sound of squirrels
- xista-mista — flash of lightning
- xixtrin — despicable
- xoko-moko — hidden places
- xotuz-xotuz — insisting
- xumli-xumla — abracadabra
- xurrut — sip, swig
- xurru-xurru — drink constantly

== Z ==
- za-za-za — speak fast
- zadura-badura — mishmash, jumble
- zafla — loud splash (water, mud)
- zaiki-paiki — shove
- zak — suddenly
- zaka-zaka — gulp down
- zalamala — tangle
- zalamandrana — ugly and scruffy woman
- zalantza-malantza — indecision
- zaldiko-maldiko — ride, merry-go-round, carousel
- zalko-zalko — astride
- zanbro — stinging, burning sensation
- zanga-zanga — drink clumsily
- zanpo — walk with the legs open
- zantzo — cheer, martial song
- zaparrada — downpour
- zapart — clash, clatter
- zapa-zapa — walk without stopping
- zaplast — sudden blow, shot
- zapotz — spigot, tap
- zaputz — insociable
- zarabanda — teeter-tooter
- zaraza — rain profusely
- zarko-marko — old crock
- zarra — walk on one's backside
- zarrantzantzan — cling-clang, metal things dragged
- zart — snap, break of a heavy object (metal, cristal)
- zar-zar — heavy rain
- zasta-zasta — pecking
- zauka-mauka — truly
- zausk — impression
- zaust — fit in easily
- zaxt — ravenously
- zehar-mehar — in both directions
- zeharo-meharo — completely
- zehats-mehatz — in great detail
- zelba-zelba — fresh
- zibli-zabla — double smack
- zikin-mikin — dirty
- zikirri-bakarra — fun-loving, busybody and clumpsy person
- zik-zak — spark
- zil — navel; umbilical cord
- zilin — weak
- zilintz — handbell
- zilin-zin-zin — not to know that to do
- zilio — scream
- zilipolot — shake a liquid in a container
- zilo-milo — holes and scratches
- ziltzi-maltza — mess
- zimel — wilted, shriveled, parched
- zimiko — sting, peck; pinch
- zimintx — hoop
- zimitz — bed bug
- zimur — wrinkle
- zin — oath, wow, promise
- zinbili-zanbula — tumbling, toppling
- zinbriki — tiny, teeny-weeny
- zinbunbuka — parade with small drums
- zinburrin — whistle, made of straw or branch bark
- zinburrun — alboka, single-reed woodwind instrument
- zinga-zinga — drink in gulps
- zingil — skinny
- zingilipurka — get drunk
- zingorro-mangorroka — stumbling, teetering
- zingo-zango — water tank
- zingulu-zangulu — shuffle
- zingun-zingun — with insistence
- zinguzango — crossbeam holding the bellow's at the blacksmith's
- zinka-minka — in earnest, putting a lot of effort
- zinki — seriously
- zinkulin-minkulin — in a finicky, squeamish way
- zinku-minku — whining
- zinkurin-minkurin — complaint, groan
- zinpiti-zanpata — fall down suddenly
- zinpi-zanpa — constantly punching
- zinpurdikatu — hang by the hands and moving legs and back
- zintz — blow one's nose; make a child blow his nose
- zintzarri — cowbell
- zintzo — honest, loyal
- zinzilo — gawky
- zipa — old small coin
- zipert egin — burst with spite
- ziperta — a tap, touch in the skull
- zipirri-zaparra — trudge, plod; blotch; wallop
- zipirt-zapart — throw punches left, right and centre
- zipi-zapa — wolfing down; pell-mell, helter-skelter
- zipla — exclamation of winning; dig, cutting remark
- zipli-zapla — slap
- zipot — belly
- zipri — lively
- zipriztin — splash
- zipunpa — rocket
- zira-bira — somersault
- zirgit egin — shudder
- zirika-mirika — pushing one's way through
- zirika-maraka — be busy with petty things
- zirikot — whey water
- ziri-mara — soft and continuous movement
- ziri-miri — drizzle
- zirimirola — whirlwind, twister
- zirin — guano, diarrhoea
- zirin-zirin — slide down a slope (as a game)
- ziripot — Basque Mardi Gras character in Lantz
- ziri-zara — glide; wriggle along
- zirki-miriki — get annoyed
- zirkin — propel
- zirkin-zarkin — walk from one place to another
- zirla — clam
- zirla-zarla — shoe's noise when walking clumsily
- zirra — profusion
- zirrazarra — sneeze
- zirri-marra — act without thinking
- zirriki-zarraka — scribble
- zirrimirri — Basque mythological character from Oiartzun
- zirrinta — dawn; ray, beam
- zirrin-zarran — drag a heavy object; expression used in card game mus when you get as many points as hamarrekos
- zirri-parra — work carelessly
- zirrist — slide; gushing out water
- zirris-zarras — sound of saw
- zirritaka — sound of red-hot-metal in contact with water
- zirri-zorro — heavy breathing; snore
- zirrizta — match a ball with a leather glove
- zirt edo zart — decisively; resolutely
- zirtako — snap
- zortziprikatu — beat a ball
- zirun-zarun — word used in Mus card game
- zirurika — spinning very fast
- ziski-naska — tangle, mess
- zist — escape, disappear suddenly
- zistu — speed, energy
- zitar — roasted
- zits — bare-legged
- zitzi — food; meat
- ziuli zaula — quick smacks
- zizipaza — lisp
- zizka-mizka — hors d'oeuvres
- zizki-mizki — trinket, detail
- zizo — blabbing
- zizpa — rifle
- zizt — sound made by an incision, a puncture
- zizti-zazta — sting several times
- ziztu — speed, quickness
- zoko-moko — nook, fold
- zonzon — idiot
- zoro-moro — to do something any old how
- zorran — gush out
- zorrotz — sharp; strict, severe
- zotin — hiccup
- zotz — expression used when refusing flatly
- zuist — quick and gliding movement
- zuku-zuku — suck, drink a liquid
- zunp — explosion, boom
- zunt — shut, locked
- zupust — insert something somewhere suddenly
- zurru eta purru — suck in, munch, crunch
- zurruburru — disagreement, quarrel
- zurrukutun — bread and cod soup
- zurrumurru — rumour; whisper
- zurrunbilo — whirlpool
- zurrunburrunka — confused, in disorder
- zurrunga — snore
- zurruntza — set somebody's teeth on edge
- zurrupita — big shower
- zurruputun — cod soup served in cider houses for sailors
- zurrut — absorbing, sipping
- zurrut eta purrut — in between sips
- zurru-zurru — in gulps
- zurt — to be alert
- zut — up!, straight
- zuzi — torch
- zuzumuzu — whispering

== See also ==
- Ideophone
- Onomatopoeia
- Japanese sound symbolism
- Cross-linguistic onomatopoeias
- Trikiti
- Txalaparta
- Euskara
- Basque alphabet
