= Paid inclusion =

When a search engine company charges websites for inclusion in their search index

Paid inclusion is a search engine marketing product where the search engine company charges fees related to inclusion of websites in their search index. The use of paid inclusion is controversial, and paid inclusion's popularity has decreased over time among search engines.

== Definition of paid inclusion ==
The FTC defined paid inclusion as "Paid inclusion can take many forms. Examples of paid inclusion include programs where the only sites listed are those that have paid; where paid sites are intermingled among non-paid sites; and where companies pay to have their Websites or URLs reviewed more quickly, or for more frequent spidering of their Websites or URLs, or for the review or inclusion of deeper levels of their Websites, than is the case with non-paid sites."

Note that paid inclusion is different from paid placement. With paid placement, companies pay search engines to rank higher than they would have ranked if relevancy was the only ranking factor. Paid placement also gives companies guaranteed top rankings if they pay for it. With paid inclusion, top rankings are not guaranteed, and only inclusion within the search engine is. Therefore, a company who paid for inclusion within a search engine will still have its rankings determined by relevancy.

== History of paid inclusion ==
In the early days of search, paid inclusion was a convenient way for search engines, such as Inktomi, Microsoft, Ask, Yahoo, Overture, AltaVista, and FAST, to obtain revenue. Unlike the other major search engines, Google decided to avoid paid inclusion and, instead, pursue higher relevancy using AdSense as its revenue source. As time went by, search engines such as Microsoft and Ask moved away from paid inclusion—both search engines ended paid inclusion programs in 2004.

=== Google's incorporation of paid inclusion ===
In 2012, Google re-incorporated paid inclusion within its search, though in a different form. Google Flights, Google Hotel Finder, and Google Shopping all have new forms of paid inclusion programs. Some critics, such as Danny Sullivan, founder of Search Engine Watch, criticize this move as a step away from the Founder's Letter that was a part of Google's IPO. Aaron Wall of the popular SEO site SEOBook.com criticize Google's use of paid inclusion as a way to push almost all organic rankings below the fold.

== Mixed views on paid inclusion ==
Paid inclusion has its advantages and drawbacks. The advantage of a paid inclusion search engine is that spam is reduced while relevancy improves. However, detractors of paid inclusion allege that it causes searches to return results based more on the economic standing of the interests of a web site, and less on the relevancy of that site to end-users. Ask Jeeves reported that paid inclusion reduced relevancy and, in 2004, ended its paid inclusion program.

== Guidelines for paid inclusion ==
The FTC has advised search engines to clearly mark paid placement and paid inclusion in accordance with Section 5 of the FTC Act. For this is only a guideline and not a law, companies with search algorithms such as Nextag and Google are not legally bound to follow it.

== See also ==
- Search engine optimization
- Favored placement
- Instant indexing
