= Place =

Place may refer to:

== Geography ==
- Place (United States Census Bureau), defined as any concentration of population
  - Census-designated place, a populated area lacking its own municipal government
- "Place", a type of street or road name
  - Often implies a dead end (street) or cul-de-sac
- Place, based on the Cornish word "plas" meaning mansion
- Place, a populated place, an area of human settlement
  - Incorporated place (see municipal corporation), a populated area with its own municipal government
- Location (geography), an area with definite or indefinite boundaries or a portion of space which has a name in an area

== Placenames ==
- Placé, a commune in Pays de la Loire, Paris, France
- Plače, a small settlement in Slovenia
- Place (Mysia), a town of ancient Mysia, Anatolia, now in Turkey
- Place, New Hampshire, a location in the United States

=== Facilities and structures ===
- Place, Fowey, a 16th-century mansion largely remodelled in the 19th century, in Fowey, Cornwall, England
- Place House, a 19th-century mansion on the site of a medieval priory, in St Anthony in Roseland, Cornwall, England
- Prideaux Place, an Elizabethan mansion in Padstow, Cornwall, England
- The Place (London), a dance and performance centre in London, England

== People with the name ==
- Place (surname), people with the surname Place

== Arts, entertainment, and media ==
=== Music ===
- "Places" (Martin Solveig song), 2016
- "Places" (Xenia Ghali song), 2016
- Place, a song by Playboi Carti, from the album Whole Lotta Red

==== Albums ====
- Places (Béla Fleck album), 1988
- Places (Brad Mehldau album), 2000
- Places (Casiopea album), 2003
- "Places", a song from Ella Henderson's 2022 album Everything I Didn't Say
- Places (Georgie James album), 2007
- Places (Jan Garbarek album), 1978
- Places (Lea Michele album), 2017

=== Other uses in arts, entertainment, and media ===
- Place, Australian magazine merged into The Adelaide Review in 2008
- r/place, a social experiment by Reddit for April Fool's Day
- wplace, a global pixel art collaboration on a map of Earth
- The Place, London, a dance and performance centre in Camden, London
- To Place, a series of books on Iceland by artist Roni Horn
- Unity of place, one of the three classical unities for drama derived from Aristotle's Poetics
- Places Journal, a journal of architecture criticism
- The Place (film), a 2017 Italian film

== Gambling ==
- Craps § Place, in craps a bet that a point number will be rolled before a seven
- Place, when betting on horse racing, wagering for a horse to win or finish second

== Mathematics ==
- Place (mathematics), an equivalence class of absolute values of an integral domain or field
- In place-value, or positional notation, the position occupied by a digit in a numeral
- Petri net, also known as a Place/transition net, a mathematical representation of discrete distributed systems

== Society ==
- Place, a person's social position
- Place identity, a group of ideas concerning significance and meanings that particular places have for their inhabitants or users
- Place setting, a table setting for a single diner
- Sense of place, a phenomenon in which people strongly identify with a particular geographical area or location

== See also ==
- Location (disambiguation)
- Locus (disambiguation), Latin for 'place'
- Placement (disambiguation)
- Plaice, a type of fish, misspelt as 'place'
- Plas (disambiguation)
- Platz (disambiguation)
- Plaza
- Laplace (disambiguation), including "la Place"
