= The Place =

The Place may refer to:

- The Place (London), a dance and performance centre in London, England
- The Place (Beijing), a mall and square with a huge video screen in Beijing, China
- The Place (film), a 2017 Italian film
- The Place (album), a 2003 music album

== See also ==
- Place (disambiguation)
