= Placement =

Placement may refer to:

- Placement (EDA), an essential step in E-design automation
- Placement exam, determines which class a student should take
- Favored placement, the practice of preferentially listing search engine results for given sites
- Job placement, a short time spent with an employer to get work experience
- Private placement, a direct offering of securities to a limited number of sophisticated institutional investors
- Product placement, a promotional tactic used by marketers in which a real commercial product is used in fictional or non-fictional media
- Public placement, see Initial public offering

== See also ==
- Emplacement (disambiguation)
- Place (disambiguation)
