= Karsten Schwan =

American computer scientist

- Born: August 21, 1952
- Died: September 28, 2015 (aged 63); Atlanta, GA
- Citizenship: American
- Education: Carnegie Mellon University; West Germany’s Christian-Albrechts Universitaet
- Known for: CERCS, distributed computing, high performance computing, middleware, autonomic computing
- Awards: IEEE Fellow (2016); HP Labs Innovation Research Award (2008)
- Scientific career
- Fields: Computer Science
- Workplaces: Georgia Institute of Technology; Ohio State University
- Doctoral advisor: Anita K. Jones
- Notable students: Fabián E. Bustamante; Dilma Da Silva; Beth Plale; Phyllis Schneck

Karsten Schwan (August 21, 1952 – September 28, 2015) was an American computer pioneer, academic who had held the position of professor of computer science and the director of Center for Experimental Research in Computer Systems (CERCS) at the Georgia Institute of Technology.

== Biography ==
Schwan grew up in Oldenburg, Germany, the second of five children to Werner and Erika Schwans. He had a life-changing experience in his teens when his father, who worked for the West German-American military, was sent to El Paso, Texas, for two years. It sparked in him a love of travel and of the U.S. His hobbies included reading science fiction books, hiking, and gardening. An East Frisian man, he greatly enjoyed starting his day with a big breakfast of fresh bread and cheese, and a regular Teetied with a traditional East Frisian tea ceremony.

He earned his B.S. degree at West Germany’s Christian-Albrechts Universitaet. Later, he received M.S. and Ph.D. degrees from Carnegie Mellon University where he began his research in high-performance computing, addressing operating and programming systems support for the Cm* multiprocessor. During the graduate school, he married Cheryl Gaimon, who later becomes Regents’ Professor at Georgia Institute of Technology. His thesis, “Tailoring Software for Multiple Processor Systems,” was selected as one of six theses in 1982 to be printed as a book in the “Computer Science Series” by UMI Research Press.

In 1983, Schwan started at Ohio State University as an assistant professor. He has two children: Valerie Ringland and Phillip Gaimon. He established the PArallel, Real-time Systems (PARTS) Laboratory, containing both custom embedded processors and commercial parallel machines, and conducting research on operating and programming system support for cluster computing and for adaptive real-time systems. In 1988, Schwan moved to Georgia Institute of Technology as an associate professor with tenure. In 2001 he co-founded CERCS, the Center for Experimental Research in Computer Systems. He became a Regents' professor in 2010.

== Awards ==
He won the 2008 HP Labs Innovation Research Award and is elected IEEE Fellow at 2016 posthumously.

Since 2016, the International Conference on Autonomic Conference (ICAC) and High-Performance Parallel and Distributed Computing (HPDC) have named the Best Paper awards after Schwan.

== Ph.D. students ==
Schwan's doctoral students include:

- Fabian Bustamante, professor at Northwestern University
- Dilma Da Silva, CS Chair at Texas A&M University
- Beth Plale, Indiana University
- Phyllis Schneck, Homeland Security
