= Lantz carnivals =

Traditional celebrations in Lantz, Navarre, Spain

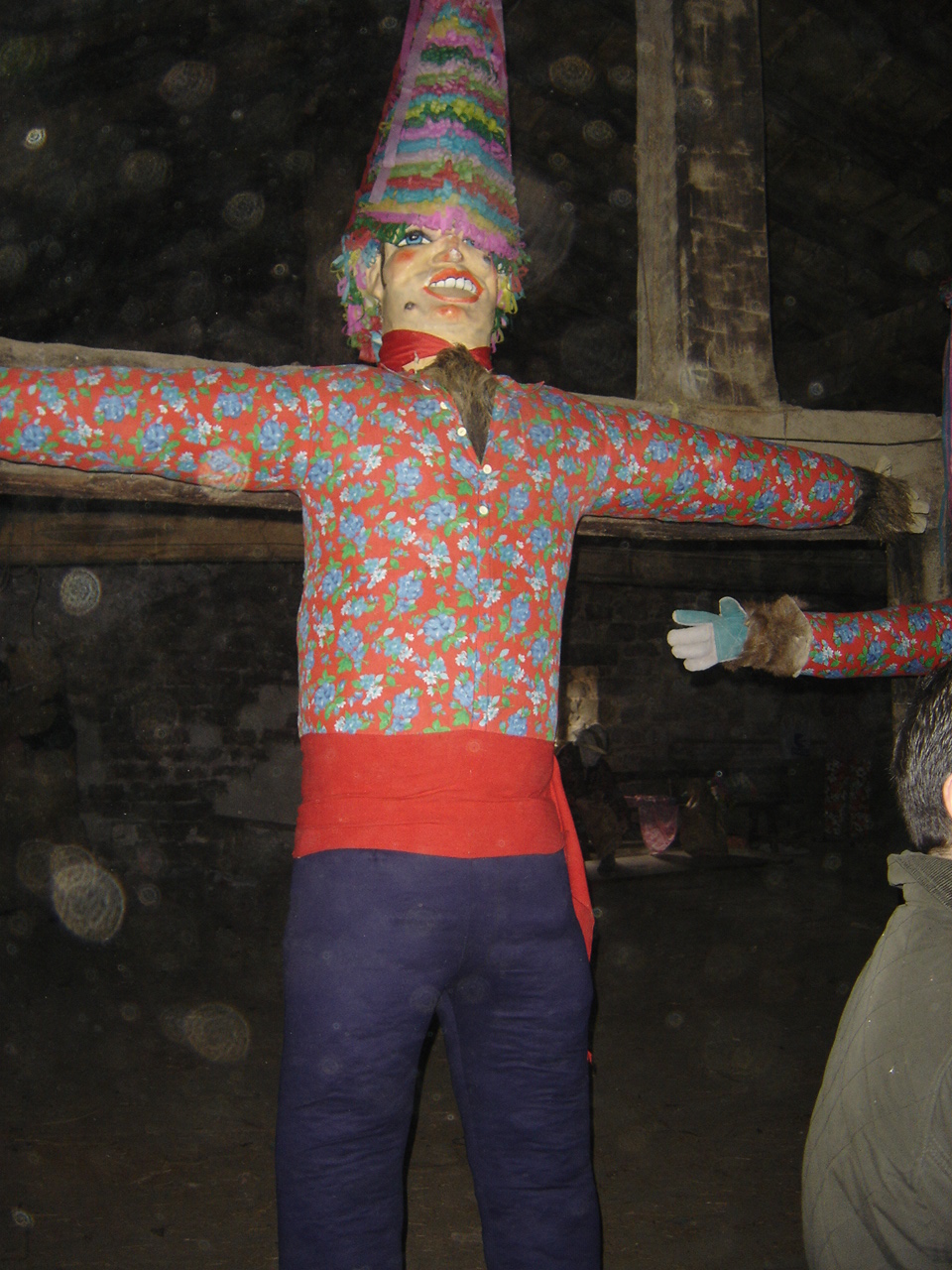
Mielotxin ostaturen ganbaran

Lantz carnivals are the traditional carnivals of Lantz, Navarre, Spain. This traditional celebration is made the day before Ash Wednesday. On the Monday and Tuesday of the carnival, the streets are filled with people who dress up as different characters. The aim is to capture the thief, Miel Otxin.

== Characters ==
The main characters are:

- Miel Otxin: Miel Otxin is a huge doll; it's believed to be based on a thief of bad repute of the region. It is also believed to be a representation of the evil spirit. On Sunday, the boys (now the girls too) prepare and adapt the doll. The doll is full of straw and a boy who plays the Gaita and the Basque whistle makes it dance around the streets.
- Ziripot:Ziripots body is covered with saddle-bags full of straw and walks hopelessly using a long stick. His face is covered, and he wears a hat which gives the appearance of a woman (not always). He has been also called “Ziri-potolo”. With Zaldiko and Miel Otxin, they walk around the street. Whenever Zaldiko attacks him, he falls, so the other characters have to help him to stand up.

According to the fable, Ziripot was a beggar who told stories, but Zaldiko and Miel Otxin steal what he earns. Annoyed, Ziripot invented terrible tales of Zaldiko and Miel Otxin and he began to tell them to the people from the town. The residents, upon hearing these stories, capture Miel Otxin and Zaldiko and decide to burn them. They say that Ziripot, repentant, runs away from Lantz.

- Zaldiko: Zaldiko goes as a wooden horse. Zaldiko's function is to escape from being tamed and iron-shod. In addition, he puts all his strength on pushing and throwing Ziripot He also pushes and shoos the people who are around him.
- Arotzak: A Basque word meaning 'farriers'. They are responsible for shoeing Zaldiko.
- Txatxoak: The Txatxos play the population from Lantz and wear animal fur and old clothes.

== Gallery ==
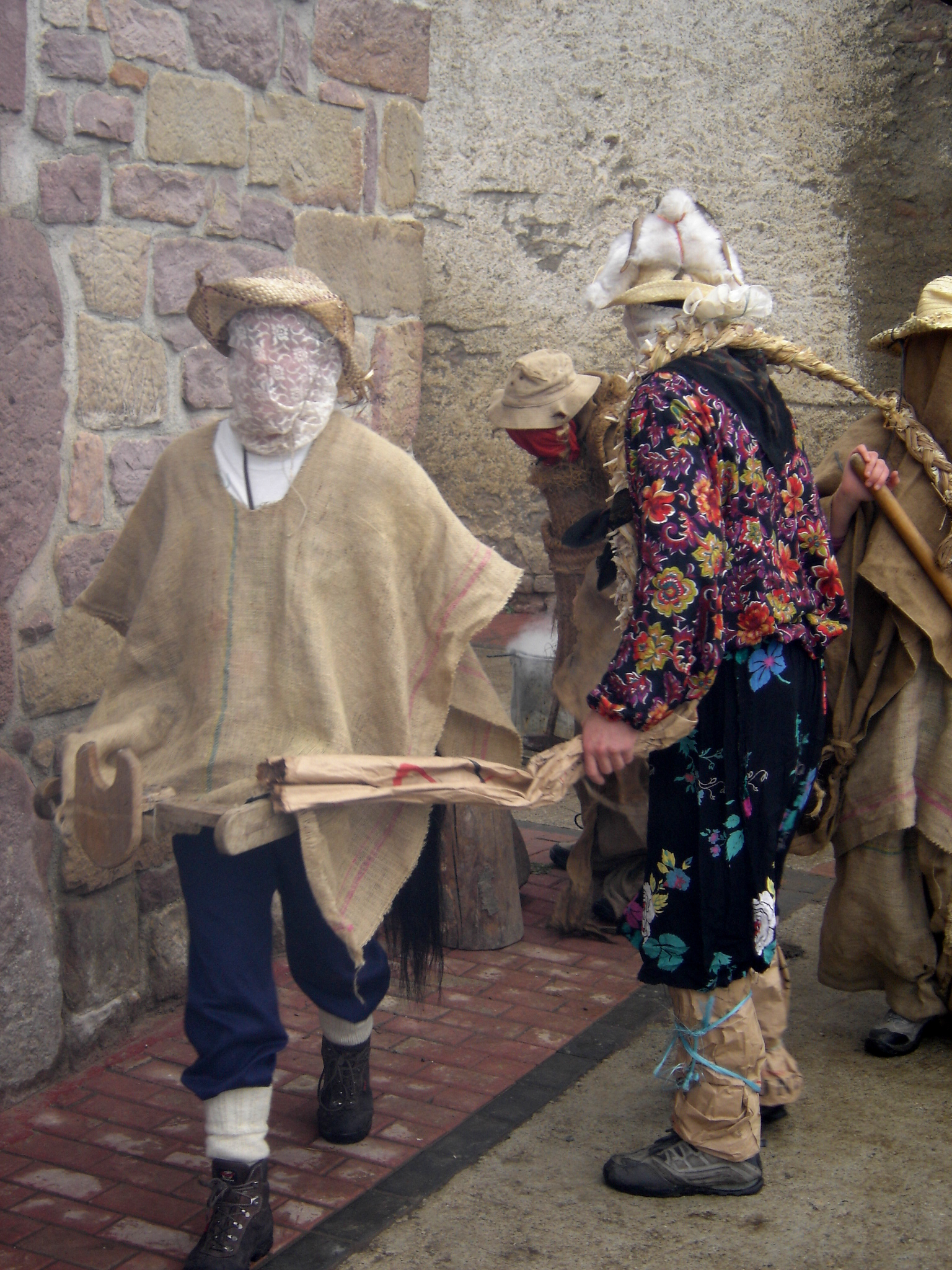
Zaldiko

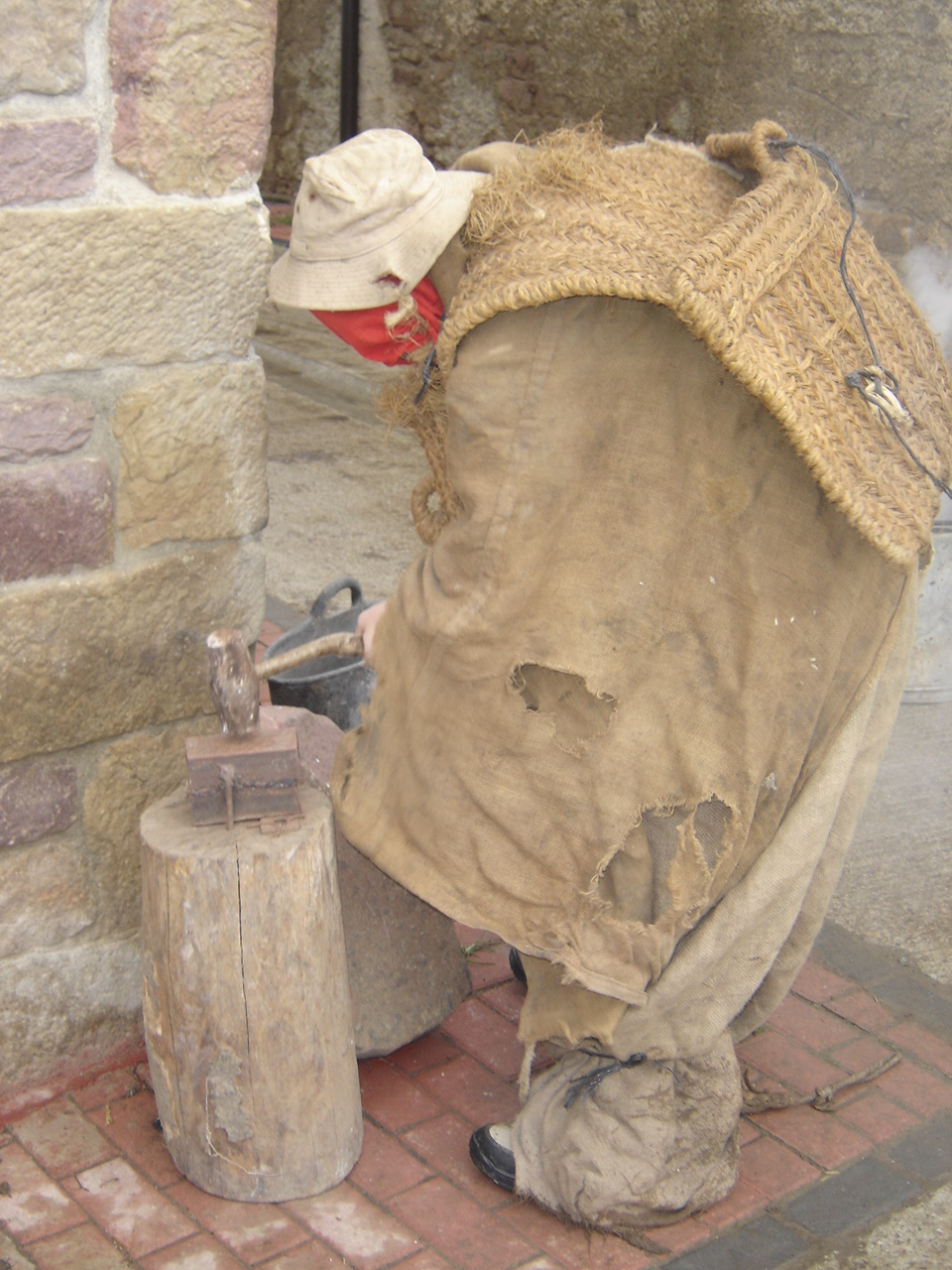
Arotzak

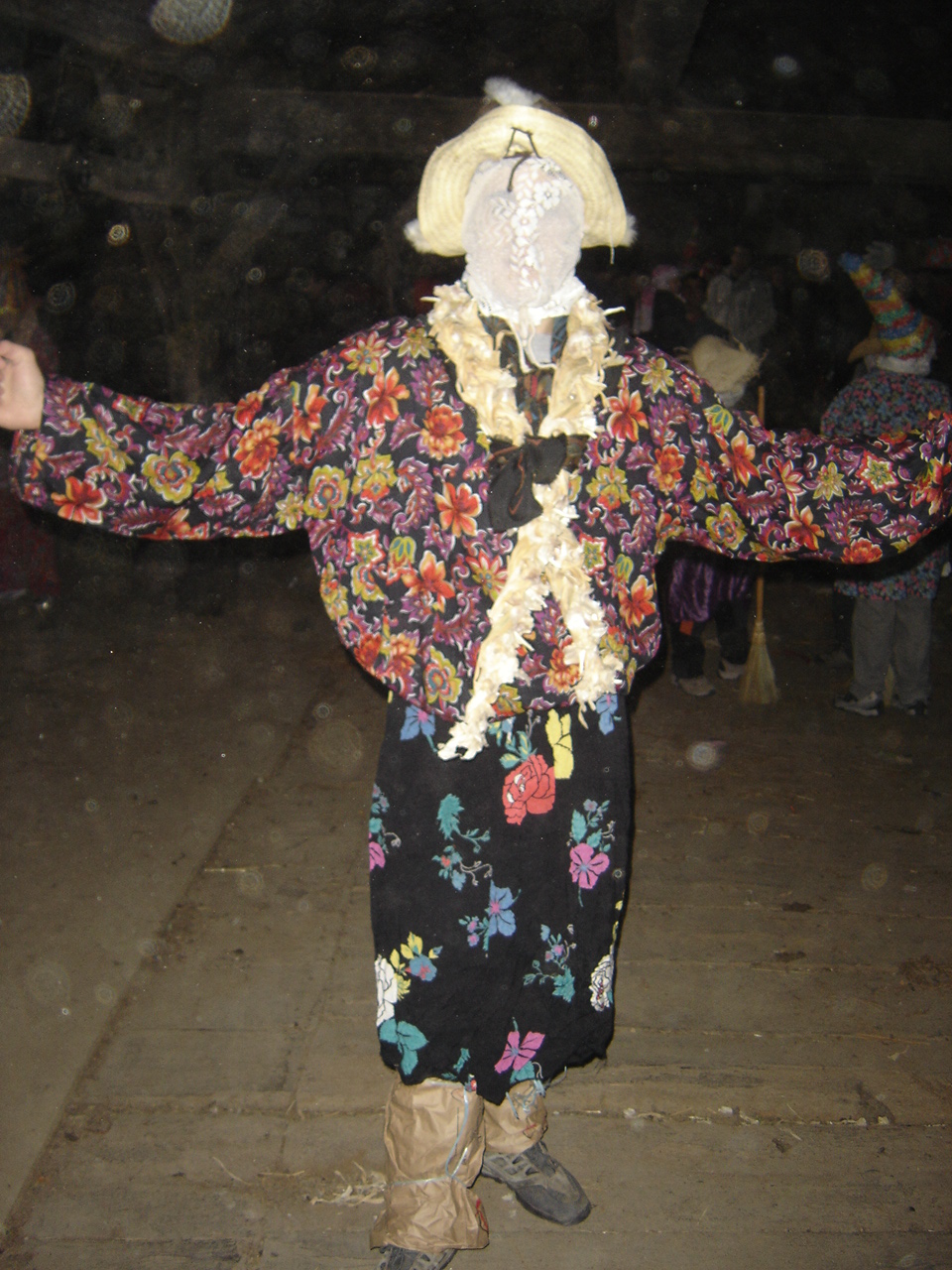
Txatxo

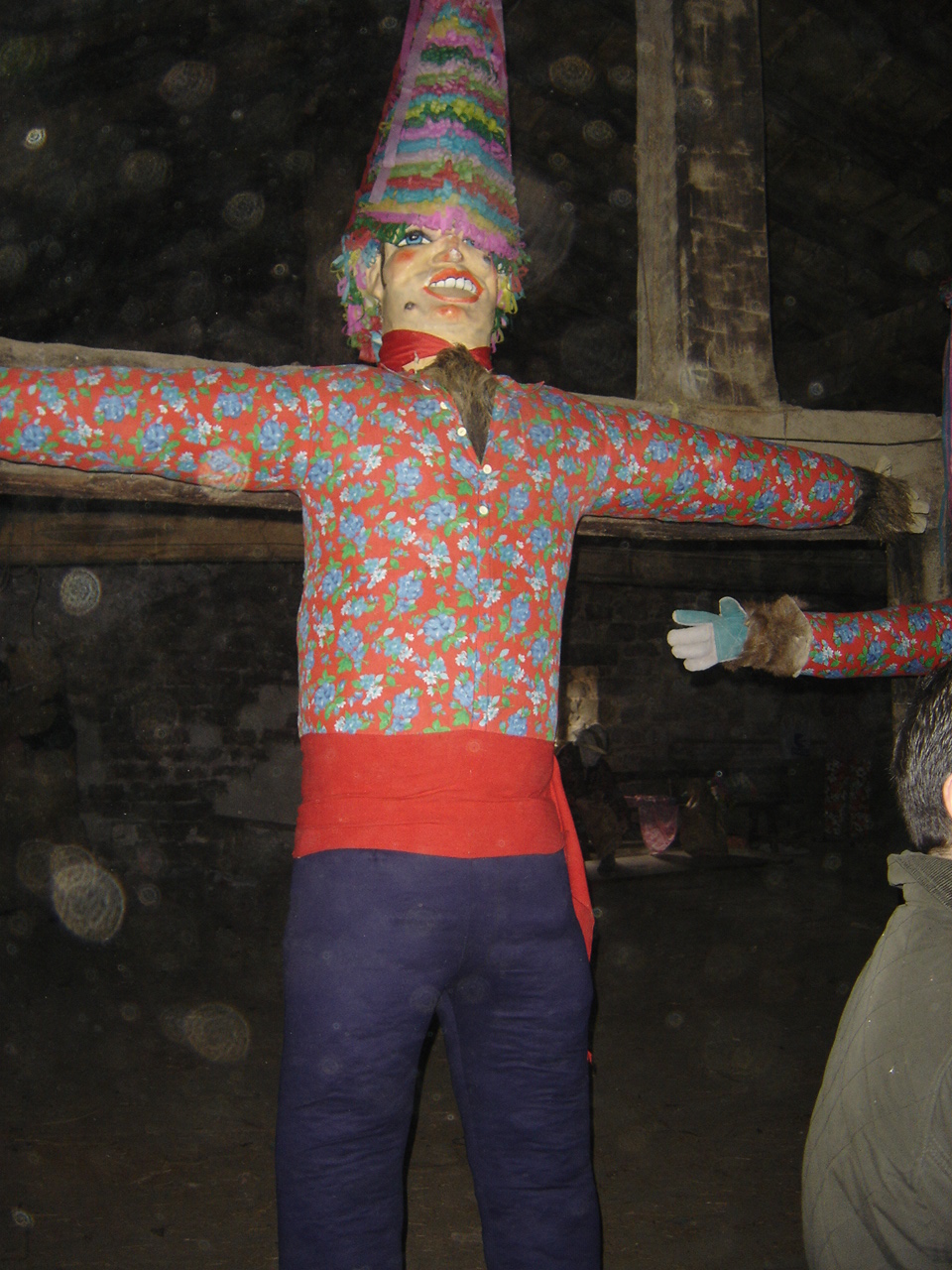
Miel Otxin

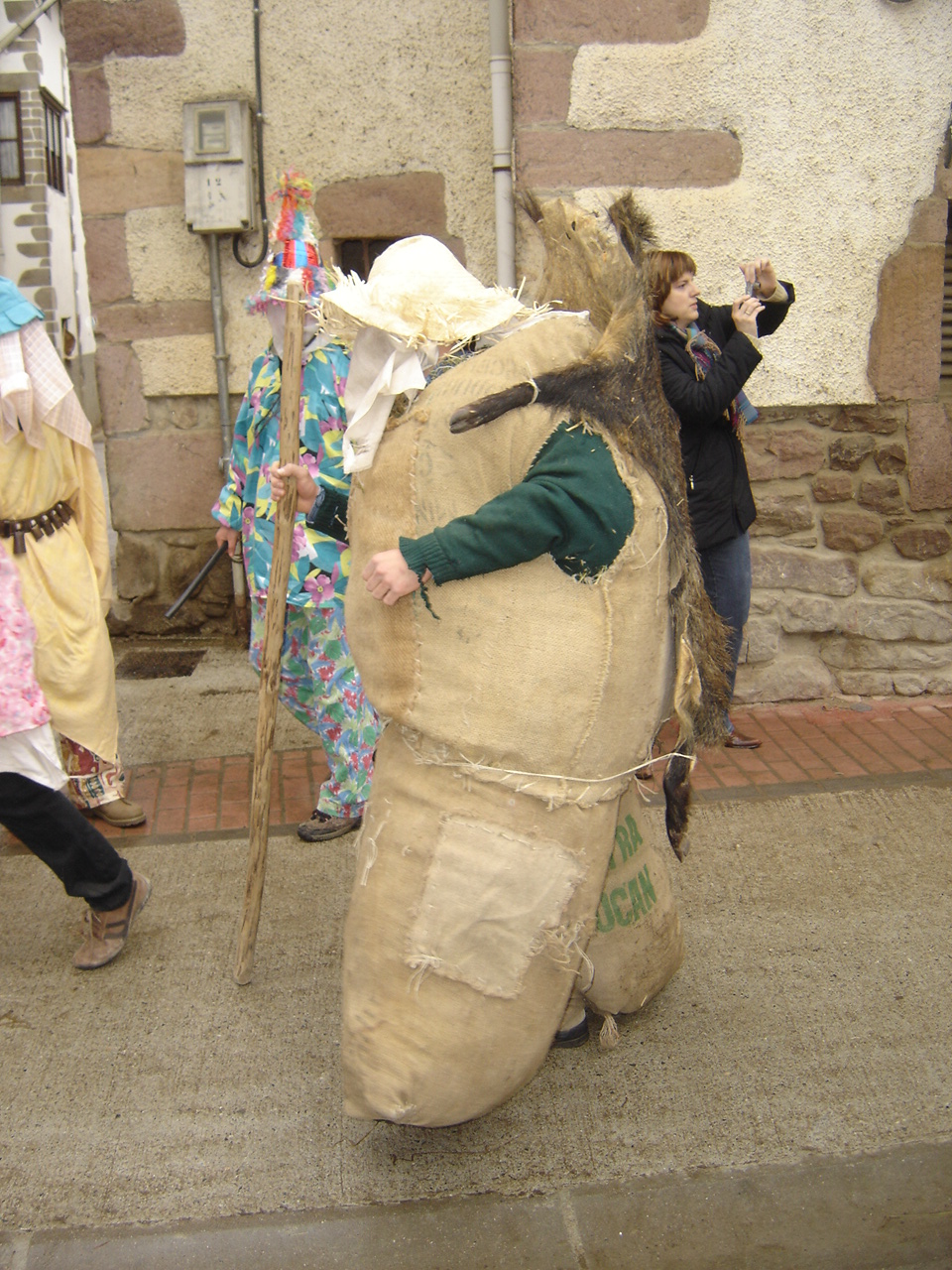
Ziripot

== See also ==
- Inauteriak Euskal Herrian
