= Emplacement =

Emplacement may refer to:

- A place where something is located
- Fortification
  - Artillery battery
  - Casemate, fortified gun emplacement
  - Redoubt, enclosed defense emplacement
- The geological process of pluton emplacement

== See also ==
- Placement (disambiguation)
