= Fabián E. Bustamante =

American computer scientist

- Citizenship: United States
- Education: Georgia Institute of Technology
- Known for: Ono, Dasu (P2P)
- Scientific career
- Fields: Computer Science
- Workplaces: Northwestern University
- Doctoral advisor: Karsten Schwan

Fabián E. Bustamante is an Argentinian-American computer scientist specializing in distributed systems and computer networking. He is currently a professor of computer science at Northwestern University.

== Career ==
Fabián E. Bustamante was born and raised in Argentina. After completing his Licencitura at Universidad Nacional de la Patagonia San Juan Bosco, he earned a Ph.D. specializing in distributed systems from the Georgia Institute of Technology under Karsten Schwan.

He is best known for his work on peer-to-peer systems and content delivery networks (particularly Ono (P2P)) and for his tool for optimizing DNS performance . He has authored more than 50 papers in various areas of Computer Science. and released over 10 publicly available systems resulting from his research work.

== Education ==
- Ph.D., Computer Science, 2001. Georgia Institute of Technology.
- Licenciatura, Computer Science, 1993. Universidad Nacional de la Patagonia San Juan Bosco.
