= Dilma Da Silva =

Brazilian-American systems software researcher

- Education: University of São Paulo; Georgia Tech
- Known for: Systems software
- Awards: ACM Distinguished Member (2011)
- Scientific career
- Fields: Computer science
- Workplaces: Texas A&M University; Qualcomm; IBM; University of São Paulo
- Doctoral advisor: Karsten Schwan
- Website: faculty.cse.tamu.edu/dilma/bio.html

Dilma Menezes Da Silva is a Brazilian-American systems software researcher known for her work in cloud computing. She holds the Ford Motor Company Design Professorship II at Texas A&M University, and is head of the Department of Computer Science and Engineering at Texas A&M.

She has been a Division Director for Computing and Communication Foundations at the NSF since June 2022. In December 2023, she has been named as the acting assistant director of Computer and Information Science and Engineering (CISE) at the National Science Foundation.

== Biography ==
Da Silva earned bachelor's and master's degrees from the University of São Paulo in 1986 and 1990 respectively. She completed her doctorate in 1997 from the Georgia Institute of Technology under the supervision of Karsten Schwan. She returned to the University of São Paulo as a senior lecturer in 1995, and on completion of her doctorate became an assistant professor there. In 2000 she moved to IBM Research at the Thomas J. Watson Research Center in New York, where she worked as a research staff member in IBM's Advanced Operating System Group. At IBM, her contributions included work on the file system of the K42 experimental operating system. In 2012 she moved to Qualcomm's Silicon Valley Research Center. At Qualcomm, her work was centered on cloud computing. In 2014 she returned to academia as the Ford Professor at Texas A&M, and as the head of the Department of Computer Science and Engineering.

== Awards and honors ==
Da Silva became an ACM Distinguished Member in 2011. In August 2024, she was designated a Regents Professor.
