= Beth Plale =

Computer scientist

Beth A. Plale
- Education: State University of New York at Binghamton
- Scientific career
- Thesis: Software approach to hazard detection using on-line analysis of safety constraints (1998)
- Doctoral advisor: Sudhir Aggarwal; Karsten Schwan

Beth A. Plale is the Executive Director of the School of Computer and Data Sciences at the University of Oregon, Eugene, OR USA. She is known for her work on open science, trust in artificial intelligence, fairness and reproducibility, and the policy implications of data science.

== Education and career ==
Plale has a B.Sc. in computer science from the University of Southern Mississippi (1984). She then received an M.B.A. from University of La Verne (1986) and an M.S. from Temple University (1992). In 1998 she earned her Ph.D. from State University of New York Binghamton, jointly supervised by Sudhir Aggarwal and Karsten Schwan.

Following her Ph.D. she was a postdoctoral fellow at Georgia Institute of Technology. In 2001, she moved to Indiana University as a tenure track professor. In 2009 she became director of the Data To Insight Center and Executive Director of the Pervasive Technology Institute in 2021.

In 2013, Plale was one of the founding scientists of the Research Data Alliance, a group working to improve open access to data. From 2017 until 2021, Plale was a science advisor at the National Science Foundation.

== Selected publications ==
- Schroeder, B.A. (June 1995). "On-line monitoring: a tutorial". Computer. 28 (6): 72–78. Bibcode:1995Compr..28f..72S. doi:10.1109/2.386988. ISSN 1558-0814.
- Simmhan, Yogesh L.; Plale, Beth; Gannon, Dennis (1 September 2005). "A survey of data provenance in e-science". ACM SIGMOD Record. 34 (3): 31–36. doi:10.1145/1084805.1084812. ISSN 0163-5808. S2CID 1263787.
- Moreau, Luc; Clifford, Ben; Freire, Juliana; Futrelle, Joe; Gil, Yolanda; Groth, Paul; Kwasnikowska, Natalia; Miles, Simon; Missier, Paolo; Myers, Jim; Plale, Beth (2011-06-01). "The Open Provenance Model core specification (v1.1)". Future Generation Computer Systems. 27 (6): 743–756. doi:10.1016/j.future.2010.07.005. ISSN 0167-739X. S2CID 8294626.

== Awards and honors ==
In 2004, Plale received an early career award from the United States Department of Energy. In 2006, Plale was named a senior member of the Association for Computing Machinery. Plale was a keynote speaker at the 2020 PIDapalooza meeting.
