= Ono (P2P) =

The Ono project is a software service that allows Peer-to-peer file sharing (P2P) clients to efficiently identify nearby peers. Using local peers takes pressure off international and other long distance transfers, and is said to simultaneously increase file download speeds.

This is a research project of Fabián E. Bustamante's AquaLab group at Northwestern University.

Ono claims to be able to increase download rates by between 31% and 207% on average, depending on whether the client is on an overloaded network or one with large available bandwidth. It is most visible as a plugin for the Azureus BitTorrent client - it is also available as an open tracker, and the Aqualab research group has recently published code to make Ono services easy to incorporate into other applications.

A more recent evaluation (one that used a single client connected to only one ISP located in the United States) has shown that Ono's benefits in practice are far short of the claims made in the original paper. In particular, when downloading real BitTorrent swarms while measuring the end-to-end benefits of using Ono, performance is unchanged, and interdomain traffic is reduced by less than 1%.

Ono is open source and does not require additional infrastructure. To determine which peers are close by, Ono learns from existing content distribution networks (CDNs) such as Akamai and Limelight. It assumes that if 2 client computers are sent to the same CDN server, they are likely to be close to each other - and more effective peers.

The P4P project shares a similar goal to Ono, but requires co-operation with ISPs and the installation of "iTracker" servers to identify nearby peers.

== See also ==
- P4P - Proactive network Provider Participation for P2P
