= Matías Plaza =

Chilean footballer

Personal information
- Full name: Matías Andrés Plaza Barrios
- Date of birth: 22 February 2001 (age 25)
- Place of birth: Casablanca, Chile
- Height: 1.67 m (5 ft 6 in)
- Position: Attacking midfielder

Team information
- Current team: Ñublense
- Number: 22

Youth career
- Defensor Casablanca
- 2012–2019: Santiago Wanderers

Senior career*
Years	Team	Apps	(Gls)
2019–2023	Santiago Wanderers	50	(7)
2021	→ Deportes Iquique (loan)	11	(0)
2024–	Ñublense	40	(2)
- * Club domestic league appearances and goals as of 3 September 2025

Matías Andrés Plaza Barrios (born 22 February 2001) is a Chilean footballer who plays as an attacking midfielder for Chilean Primera División club Ñublense.

== Club career ==
Born in Casablanca, Chile, Plaza was with local club Defensor Casablanca before joining the Santiago Wanderers youth ranks, aged 11. Having trialed with Lanús in 2017, he was promoted to the first team in 2019 and made his professional debut in 2022. His last match with them was against Deportes Iquique on 10 December 2023 for the Primera División promotion play-off. During the 2021 season, Plaza was loaned out to Deportes Iquique.

In January 2024, Plaza signed with Ñublense in the Chilean Primera División. The next season, he took part in the 2025 Copa Libertadores.

== International career ==
Plaza has taken part in training microcycles of Chile U17 and Chile U20.

== Personal life ==
Matías is the twin brother of the footballer Diego Plaza and the younger brother of the former footballer Marco Plaza.
