= Laplace (disambiguation) =

Pierre-Simon Laplace was a French mathematician and astronomer.

Laplace, LaPlace or La Place may also refer to:

== Places ==
- Laplace Island (Antarctica)
- La Place, Illinois
- LaPlace, Louisiana
- Promontorium Laplace, a place on the Moon
- 4628 Laplace, an asteroid

=== Fictional locations ===
- Laplace, a space colony destroyed at the beginning of Mobile Suit Gundam Unicorn

== People ==
- La Placa (surname)

=== People with the surname ===
- Charles Laplace (died 2008), West Indian murderer
- Cyrille Pierre Théodore Laplace (1793–1875), French navigator
- Luis Laplace (fl 1995-), Argentine architect
- Pierre-Simon Laplace (1749–1827), French mathematician and astronomer
- Victor Laplace (born 1943), Argentine actor

== Transportation, transport stations, vehicles ==
- Laplace (Paris Metro), a Paris Metro station
- French ship Laplace (A 793), a hydrographic survey ship of the French Navy

=== Spaceflight ===
- EJSM/Laplace, a proposed European space mission; precursor to JUICE
- Laplace-P, a proposed Russian space mission

== Other uses ==
- La Place (band), a French band
- LAPLACE (laboratory), a French physics laboratory
- La Place (restaurant chain)
- Lapras, a fictional species in the Pokémon franchise, called "Laplace" in Japanese

== See also ==
- Laplace distribution, a probability distribution
- Laplace operator, a differential operator equal to the divergence of the gradient of a function
- Laplace pressure, a pressure difference between the inside and the outside of a curved surface
- Laplace transform, integral transform
- Laplace's equation, an elliptic partial differential equation
- Laplacian matrix, matrix representation in graph theory
- Place (disambiguation)
- LA (disambiguation)
