= Plazas (surname) =

Plazas is a surname. Notable people with the surname include:

- Cristina Plazas (born 1969), Spanish actress
- Jessica Plazas (born 2002), Colombian tennis player
