= Antonio Plaza =

Antonio Plaza from the University of Extremadura, Caceres, Spain was named Fellow of the Institute of Electrical and Electronics Engineers (IEEE) in 2015 for contributions to hyperspectral data processing and parallel computing of Earth observation data.
