= Platz =

Platz may refer to:

== People ==
- David Platz (1929–1994), German-British music producer
- Elizabeth Platz, American Lutheran pastor
- Eric Platz (born 1973), American drummer
- Greg Platz (born 1950), Australian rugby league footballer
- Gustav Adolf Platz (1881-1947), German architect
- Hans Platz (1919-1988), German chess player
- Joseph Platz (1905 – 1981), German–American chess master
- Lew Platz, (fl. 1952), Australian rugby league footballer
- Paul Platz (1920–2012), Canadian ice hockey left winger
- Reinhold Platz (1886-1966), German aircraft designer and manufacturer
- Robert H.P. Platz (born 1951), German composer
- Tom Platz (born 1955), American professional bodybuilder

== Places ==
- Platz, the German name for the municipality of Místo, Ústí nad Labem, Czech Republic
- Platz an der Naser, the German name for Stráž nad Nežárkou, South Bohemia, Czech Republic
- Platz, Graubünden, a place in the Swiss canton of Graubünden
- Platz der Luftbrücke, a city square and transport node in Berlin, Germany

== Other uses ==
- Plätze in Städten, a 1998 German drama film
- Toyota Platz, a small car
