= Ituren =

Town in Spain

Coordinates: 43°08′N 1°42′W

Ituren is a town and municipality located in the province and autonomous community of Navarre, northern Spain. Ituren sits on a westernmost outlying area of the Pyrenees, 56.5 km north of Pamplona. It lies on the flood plain of the River Ezkurra, a tributary of the River Bidasoa, in the shadow of the Mendaur mountain (1,060 m (3,480 ft)) which is characterised by the tiny white-washed chapel of La Trinidad, on its summit.

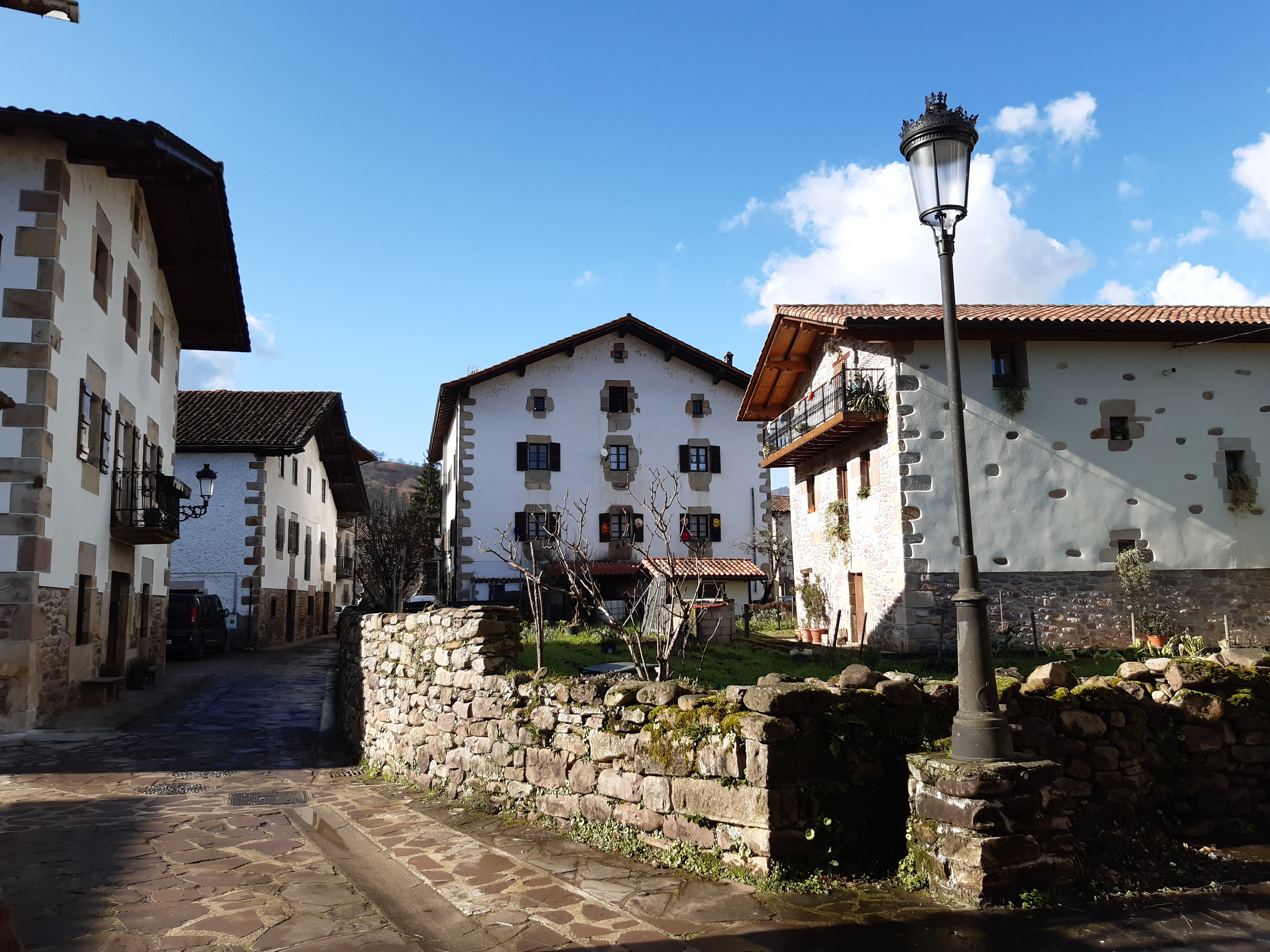
Partial view of Ituren streets

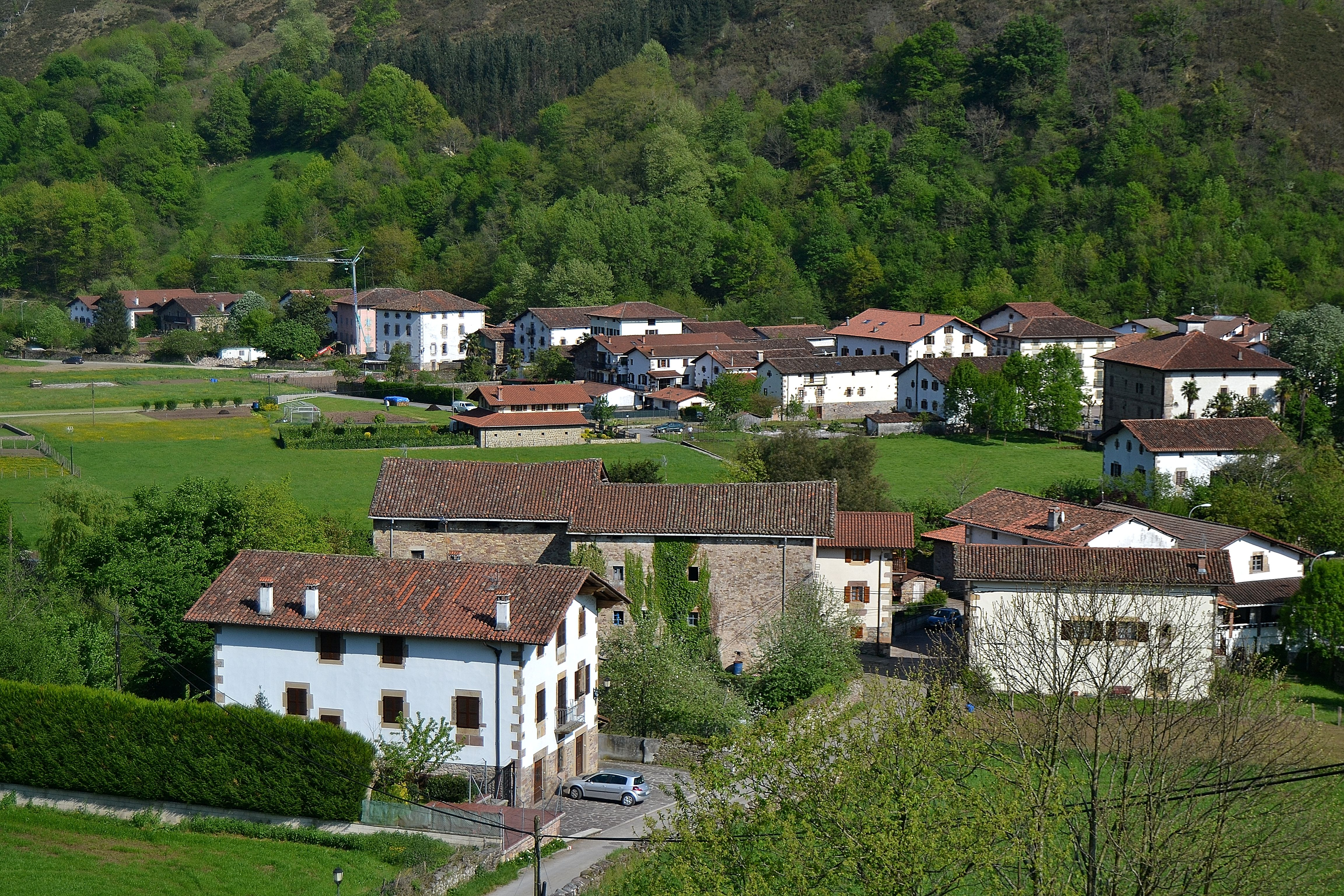
View over Ituren

== Geography ==
The territory of Ituren extends over an area of 15 km^{2}. In 2012 the town had a population of 518 inhabitants, a 10% increase over the past 10 years. In 2013, 64 children were enrolled at the village primary school which instructs the pupils in Basque (Euskera). The inhabitants of Ituren are distributed between 4 small dependent hamlets and isolated homesteads. These hamlets are Ituren, Aurtiz, and Lasaga on the valley floor and, the smallest of all, the higher mountain hamlet of Ameztia. The valley, extending east to west, is called Malerreka after the river.

Although there are extensive pastures, orchards of quince, apple, cherry, fig, and peach trees are common and the mountain slopes are partly covered with oak, chestnut, walnut, beech, and ash.

== Urbanism ==
Ituren is a traditional village built in typical Basque style with large, solid houses with steep-sloping red-tiled roofs and wooden balconies often decorated with geraniums. Many of them have distinctive pink sandstone markings around the doors and window frames, a common feature of Basque design. Some of the manor houses in the village have gothic details and date back to the 17th century.

== Economy ==
In 2013 the village had a butchers, a general supplies store, a chemists, a hair-dressers, two bars, a restaurant, and school. There are also numerous summer rental chalets and rural hotels as well as other tourism operators.

There are many small-scale family farms dedicated to pastoral farming in the area, the main animals being sheep and cows (both reared for their meat and milk). The indigenous long-haired breed of sheep, the Latxa, is very popular among the shepherds and many farmers still make sheep’s cheese from the unpasteurised milk. This is a local version of the acclaimed Domination of Origin Idiazabal cheese. Pigs and chickens are also reared on the farms and semi-wild herds of Potxoka horses roam the communally-owned higher mountain slopes. Other local produce include quince jam; cuajada, also called mamia (sheep’s mild junket); and Patxarran (a sloe berry and aniseed liqueur).

== Traditions ==
Ituren is a predominantly Basque-speaking community, maintaining its Basque traditions. The annual fiesta is held during the third week of July and includes traditional Basque dancing and rural sports competitions.

In October wood-pigeon, wild boar hunting, and mushrooming are part of the local tradition. The neighbouring village of Elgorriaga holds a mushroom festival on the first Sunday of the month.

=== Carnival ===
Ituren is by far best known for the ‘pagan’ carnival which it shares with the neighbouring village of Zubieta. This carnival takes place on the first Monday and Tuesday after the last Sunday in January and has earned international recognition with some anthropologists arguing that it is the oldest pre-Indo-European carnival in Europe. The protagonists are the called Joadunak (Zanpanzar). During the carnival the young men from the village, the Joaldunak, don sheepskins and conical hats with ribbons; they carry horse hair whips and strap large cows bells around their waists which they ring in a deep, rhythmic and atavistic dirge. The rest of the villagers dress up as demons and witches who scatter in their wake as the carnival symbolises the eternal struggle between the forces of good and evil; light and darkness, winter and spring.
