= Phyllis Schneck =

American executive

Deputy Under Secretary for Cybersecurity and Communications for the National Protection and Programs Directorate (NPPD), DHS
- In office August 19, 2013 – January 20, 2017
- President: Barack Obama
- Preceded by: Mark Weatherford
- Succeeded by: Jeanette Manfra

Personal details
- Party: Democratic
- Education: Johns Hopkins University; Georgia Institute of Technology

Phyllis Schneck is an American executive and cybersecurity professional. As of May 2017, she became the managing director at Promontory Financial Group. Schneck served in the Obama administration as Deputy Under Secretary for Cybersecurity and Communications for the National Protection and Programs Directorate (NPPD), at the Department of Homeland Security.

== Career ==
She holds a Ph.D. in computer science from Georgia Tech.

She was chairman of the board of directors of the National Cyber-Forensics and Training Alliance, a partnership between corporations, government and law enforcement for cyber analysis to combat international cybercrime. Schneck also served as the vice chairman of the National Institute of Standards and Technology information security and privacy advisory board. Schneck spent eight years as chairman of the national board of directors of the FBI's InfraGard program, growing the organization from 2,000 to over 30,000 members nationwide.

Schneck was service vice president of research integration for Secure Computing Corporation, where she conceived and built the early intelligence practice into a data-as-a-service program. She also worked as vice president of corporate strategy at SecureWorks, and founder and CEO of Avalon Communications, which was acquired by SecureWorks.

Prior to joining government in 2013, Schneck worked in the private sector, at McAfee. She testified before Congress on cybersecurity technology and policy.

On October 14, 2019, Schneck joined Northrop Grumman as vice president and chief information security officer.

== Government position ==
From 2013 to 2017, Schneck served in the Obama administration as the Deputy Under Secretary for Cybersecurity and Communications for the National Protection and Programs Directorate (NPPD). She was the chief cybersecurity official for the Department of Homeland Security (DHS) and supported its mission of strengthening the security and resilience of the nation's critical infrastructure.

== Awards ==
- Loyola University Maryland David D. Lattanze Center 2012 Executive of the Year
- Information Security Magazine's Top 25 Women Leaders in Information Security
- Johns Hopkins University Woodrow Wilson Award 2016
