= Marco Plaza =

Chilean footballer (born 1982)

Personal information
- Full name: Marco Antonio Plaza Berríos
- Date of birth: 24 February 1982 (age 44)
- Place of birth: Casablanca, Chile
- Height: 1.77 m (5 ft 10 in)
- Position: Midfielder

Senior career*
Years	Team	Apps	(Gls)
2000–2003	Everton		
2003	Constitución Unido		
2004	Ñublense		
2005	Iberia		
2006	Lota Schwager		
2007	Rangers	36	(2)
2008	Unión La Calera	38	(2)
2009	Deportes Melipilla	53	(9)
2010–2011	Coquimbo Unido	49	(6)
2012	Iberia	21	(6)
2013–2014	Deportes Melipilla	35	(5)
2015	Deportes Ovalle	11	(1)
2015–2016	Malleco Unido	22	(2)
- * Club domestic league appearances and goals as of 22 May 2016

Marco Antonio Plaza Barrios (born 24 February 1982) is a Chilean former professional footballer who played as a midfielder.

Born in Casablanca, Chile, he spent a 17-year playing career with several clubs in the Chilean football league system, including Everton, Ñublense, Rangers, Unión La Calera, Deportes Melipilla, Coquimbo Unido and Iberia.

Plaza won promotion with Ñublense in 2004, scoring the opening goal in the decisive match against Curicó Unido, and later won the inaugural professional Segunda División championship with Iberia in 2012, scoring the goal that secured the title.

== Club career ==
=== Everton and Ñublense ===
Plaza was developed by Everton and began his senior career with the Viña del Mar club. He remained associated with Everton until the end of 2004, while also spending time with Constitución Unido.

In 2004, Plaza joined Ñublense, then competing in Chile's Tercera División. He became a member of the side that challenged Curicó Unido for the championship and promotion to the second tier.

Ñublense and Curicó eventually required a deciding match in Linares on 28 December 2004. Plaza scored the opening goal as Ñublense won 2–0, earning the Tercera División championship and promotion to the Primera B. Contemporary coverage by Cooperativa named Plaza, goalkeeper Germán Irarrázabal and Ricardo Parada among the key figures in Ñublense's promotion campaign.

Following the match, Plaza confirmed that his contract with Everton had ended and that he held his own registration rights.

Years later, Plaza recalled the 2004 campaign as one of the most memorable promotions of his career, describing the large support received by Ñublense during the decisive matches of the season.

=== Seasons in Primera B ===
Plaza joined Iberia for the 2005 Primera B season after leaving Ñublense. He subsequently played for Lota Schwager in 2006 and Rangers in 2007.

With Rangers, he made 36 league appearances and scored twice before moving to Unión La Calera for the 2008 season.

Plaza joined Unión La Calera in 2008, making 38 league appearances and scoring two goals during his season with the club.

In 2009, he moved to Deportes Melipilla, where he became a regular midfielder in the Primera B.

=== Coquimbo Unido ===
Plaza joined Coquimbo Unido ahead of the 2010 Primera B season. He remained with the club for two seasons, making 49 league appearances and scoring six goals.

During the 2011 Copa Chile, he scored for Coquimbo Unido against regional rivals Deportes La Serena at the Estadio La Portada.

He left Coquimbo Unido after the 2011 season to return to Iberia.

=== Return to Iberia ===
Plaza returned to Iberia in 2012 for the first season of Chile's newly established professional third tier, the Segunda División Profesional. He featured in Iberia's opening match of the competition, a draw away to Deportes Melipilla.

On 21 July 2012, Plaza scored twice in Iberia's 3–1 away victory over Deportes Copiapó, a result which left the club alone at the top of the league standings.

Iberia eventually reached the final stage of the competition. On 4 November 2012, Plaza scored the only goal of a 1–0 away victory over Deportes Temuco. The result secured first place for Iberia with 37 points and made the Los Ángeles club champion of the 2012 Segunda División Profesional.

=== Later career ===
Following his championship season with Iberia, Plaza returned to Deportes Melipilla in 2013 and remained with the club through 2014.

In January 2015, he joined Deportes Ovalle for the second half of the 2014–15 Segunda División season. He featured during the club's campaign, including matches against Trasandino and Naval.

Later in 2015, Plaza moved to Malleco Unido, his final club as a player. He retired from professional football in 2016 after a career spanning approximately 17 years.

== Personal life ==
He is the older brother of the twins Diego Plaza and Matías Plaza, who are professional footballers that have begun their careers playing for Santiago Wanderers.

== Honors ==
Ñublense

- Tercera División de Chile: 2004

Iberia

- Segunda División Profesional de Chile: 2012
