= La Placa =

La Placa or LaPlaca is a surname. Notable people with the name include:

- Alison LaPlaca, American actress
- Jean-Pierre La Placa, Swiss footballer
- Joe La Placa, American art dealer

La Placa can also refer to:

- La plaquita or "la placa", a Dominican bat-and-ball game

== See also ==
- Alan Placa, American Catholic priest
- La Place (disambiguation)
