= Purchase for Progress =

WFP initiative

Purchase for Progress (P4P) is an initiative of the United Nations World Food Programme (WFP), involving over 500 partnerships, including Bill & Melinda Gates Foundation, the Howard G. Buffett Foundation, FAO, ACDI/VOCA, TechnoServe and others. Launched in September 2008 as a five-year pilot, P4P sought to explore programming and procurement modalities with the greatest potential to stimulate agricultural and market development in ways that maximized benefits to smallholder farmers. The program, largely developed by the eleventh Executive Director of the WFP, Josette Sheeran, arose as the WFP desired to purchase food in a way that was part of the "solution to hunger". These efforts are aligned with recommendations issued by the UN Committee on Economic, Social and Cultural Rights that call for an establishment of programs in support of socially vulnerable groups. and to the Zero Hunger Challenge launched by the UN Secretary-General Ban Ki-moon. Special UN Reporter 2012–2014, Olivier De Schutter, claimed that public procurement systems favour economically strong bidders, thus excluding smallholder farmers. His conclusion was that public procurement schemes supportive of smallholders could have "powerful impacts on the reduction of rural poverty." P4P is built upon this very principle as it enables low-income farmers to supply food to the WFP's operations. Eventually, the transaction can be regulated by a forward contract, with the farmer agreeing to sell in the future (up to three years) a certain amount of output at a fixed price. Essentially, the P4P program aims to create a wide and sophisticated market for commodities in developing countries.

According to WFP, the initiative, which has been piloted in 20 countries, aimed to help hundreds of thousands of poor farmers to "gain access to reliable markets to sell their surplus crops at competitive prices". Beyond the farmers gaining access to the market, the program aimed to help them reduce their risk, leverage credit to expand production and to diversify crops. The stated goal of the program was "to facilitate increased agricultural production and sustained market engagement and thus increase incomes and livelihoods for participating smallholder/low-income farmers, the majority of whom are women". Quantifying this goal, the WFP sought to work with at least 500,000 smallholder farmers and increase their income by $50 a year by the end of the program initiative. By December 2014, P4P supported over a million farmers and trained over half a million individuals.

WFP's 2014–2017 Strategic Plan states that it will continue increasing the amount of food it buys from smallholder farmers while working with governments and other buyers to assist smallholder farmers in accessing lucrative markets.

== Procurement ==
Through P4P, WFP tested different ways of procuring staple foods (primarily cereals and pulses) from smallholder farmers, aiming to identify models that could sustainably promote smallholder agricultural development and access to public and private sector markets. WFP's procurement from smallholders and small/medium traders (the demand pillar) was intended to provide the inducement and motivation for action around the P4P development hypothesis. WFP designed the new P4P procurement modalities specifically to deal with the difficulties that smallholder farmers face in selling to WFP. The P4P procurement modalities fell into four general categories: (1) pro-smallholder competitive tendering; (2) direct contracting; (3) forward contracting; and (4) processing options. P4P tested not only different contract types but also different mechanisms for aggregation. In addition to farmers' organizations, P4P also worked with small and medium-scale traders and structured trading platforms such as warehouse receipt systems and commodity exchanges, along with linking farmers to processors. WFP itself also bought processed food such as high energy biscuits (HEBs) and fortified flour from processors using raw materials sourced from P4P-supported organizations.

The basic challenge facing WFP under P4P was to shape and manage a process that involved creating extra demand for staple food crops produced by smallholder farmers, reaching an appropriate level of supply adapted to that demand, and ensuring that benefits accrued to the smallholder farmers. WFP succeeded in procuring over 367,000 metric tons (mt) of food over the five-year pilot, putting more than US$148 million more directly into the hands of smallholder farmers (US$30 million/year on average). Further, farmer organizations not previously selling collectively sold another US$60 million worth of quality food to buyers beyond WFP. Almost all P4P contracts were below import parity prices, therefore respecting WFP's principle of "cost-efficient procurement" and realizing cost savings relative to importation. Compared to import parity, total savings over the course of the five years exceeded US$40 million. These outcomes hinged on several important investments. Novel partnerships and platforms were a necessity, along with a range of new products and services. In many important ways, therefore, WFP and its partners ventured into virgin territory under P4P. A core principle guiding the thoughts of the original designers was that the pilot's "failures" would yield learnings and lessons at least as important as its "successes". The charge to WFP was to think outside the box, innovate, and evolve, knowing that not everything attempted would work. This report provides a comprehensive view of key aspects of that experimentation and learning process, detailing the extraordinarily wide array of opportunities generated by the P4P approach, along with the correspondingly deep set of challenges addressed.

== Partnerships ==
In order to provide a wide set of services and support to smallholder farmers, P4P relied on the expertise and collaboration of numerous partners. P4P strengthened supply-side partnerships to help smallholders produce surplus crops by providing them with access to agricultural inputs, skills and equipment, as well as machinery and storage to prevent post-harvest losses. Various NGOs, private sector companies, academic institutions, other UN agencies such as the International Fund for Agricultural Development (IFAD) and FAO all proved to be invaluable backers. In fact, IFAD and FAO were the key partners, with FAO facilitating smallholders' access to agricultural markets and training on farming practices and storage, while IFAD supported representatives from farmers' organizations and partners in their negotiations with financial institutions. Other partners such as UNDP, UN Women, UNOPS and ILO allowed P4P to broaden its scope of action and tackle multifarious challenges faced by smallholder farmers.

Demand-side partners, including WFP, were crucial for the support smallholder farmers needed in order to produce crops that meet international quality standards used by WFP and other large buyers, as well as to aid them in aggregating their crops. WFP, NGOs, microfinance institutions, banks, input suppliers and private sector companies also helped farmers gain knowledge on financial services and the market in general, so as to access credit and understand the importance and risks of agricultural investment and negotiations, Investment in agricultural inputs was facilitated by P4P efforts to improve smallholders' access to credit, as smallholder farmers used their WFP food supply contracts as a collateral for loans.

Programme's sustainability was further strengthened by government engagement in the 20 pilot countries. P4P experience proved valuable as tools governments need to support smallholder farmers. The government of Rwanda was the first one to adopt a national P4P programme, called Common P4P (CP4P), implemented by the Ministry of Agriculture and Animal Resources (MINAGRI). The programme entails buying 40% of the National Strategic Grain Reserve supply from farmers' organizations whose members are smallholders. P4P was helpful in the government's design of the project and the mobilization of partners who trained participating farmers. Other governments followed the lead and representatives of Burkina Faso, Ghana and Kenya engaged with the Rwandan government so as to learn how they can adopt similar initiatives. Following this exchange of information in 2012, SONAGESS, the national food reserve agency of Burkina Faso, committed to purchasing 30% of its needs from smallholder farmers' organizations. In Tanzania, WFP agreed to buy directly from the Government's National Food Reserve Agency (NFRA), which, in turn, promised to buy a portion of its supply from smallholder farmers.

Latin American pilot countries have all capitulated upon the work of P4P; the government of El Salvador has implemented P4P lessons into its Family Agriculture Plan, the Government of Guatemala has created the Triangle of Dignity program inspired by P4P, whose concept was also implemented in the National Food and Security Strategy (2010–2022) of Honduras. National Grain Reserve of Nicaragua also started buying food from P4P-supported farmers' organizations.

Important initiatives such as the School Feeding Programme implemented by governments with WFP support also provided opportunities for smallholder farmers, whose crops were used for the school meals. By combining the two initiatives, WFP multiplied the benefits, thus increasing school enrollment, fighting undernutrition, developing government capacity, and bolstering the local economy and financial opportunities of smallholder farmers. Women farmers are also favoured by this initiative, as Home Grown School Feeding (HGSF) targeted crops usually produced by women. HGSF also helped connect P4P-supported farmers and initiatives such as Purchase from Africans for Africa (PAA), inspired by Brazil's national Food Purchase Programme. Implemented in Ethiopia, Malawi and Mozambique, P4P-supported farmers sold their fresh and staple crops to the HGSF programme.

== Gender strategy and lessons learned ==
As women play a significant role in worldwide agricultural production, yet meanwhile compromise the majority of those experiencing hunger, WFP has created a specific gender strategy for P4P. After conducting a study addressing the challenges to incorporating more women into the program, P4P has outlined the following objectives for their gender strategy:

- "Increasing the understanding of the importance of gender relations based on equity, within beneficiaries' households, Farmer Organizations and supply side partners."
- "Increasing and creating opportunities for women to participate in groups and decision-making."
- "Facilitating and increasing the ability of rural women to access, control and manage resources and agricultural services."
- "Diversifying opportunities for women in income-generating agro-activities."

P4P recently released a paper on how the pilot contributed to women's empowerment, detailing the P4P pilot's lessons learned in terms of what works and what doesn't when it comes to gender equity and empowerment of women farmers. The paper found to best work with women farmers, the initiative needed to utilize context-specific action plans, specific strategies to target women farmers, equipment and capacity development, ensure the inclusion of men, carry out risk awareness and use a household negotiation approach. Furthermore, the report concludes that assessment of gender achievements must go beyond counting the number of women vs men involved. Nuanced examinations will inform new methods to more effectively facilitate the empowerment of women farmers. One such lesson learned by the World Food Programme was the importance of emphasising the procurement of traditional "women's crops", such as niébé, in order to increase women's participation in sales.

P4P gender-focused efforts were also praised by Ritu Sharma, who found them to be conscious of the diverse context in which women farmers live She also extolled P4P for dedicating focused resources and strategies to improving women's awareness of their own rights, and dynamics of various types of domestic violence, as well as training them on the most successful agricultural methods.

== Criticism ==
Following an independent mid-term evaluation in 2010, a comprehensive final evaluation of the pilot was completed in November 2014, seeking to ascertain the extent to which best practices were identified and shared, and the extent to which these practices led to increased income and sustained market engagement for farmers. The evaluation also considered the extent to which WFP's purchasing approach was transformed to support sustainable small-scale procurement. Finally, the evaluation assessed how the pilot initiative's multi-level organizational framework and the systems put in place to support the implementation contributed to the results achieved, intended and unintended. The evaluation was rigorous and comprehensive, yielding results that will be important to both WFP and the wider external network of stakeholders with direct and indirect interest in smallholder engagement in staple food markets.

Overall, the independent evaluation concluded that P4P was highly relevant to WFP and the international agenda on agriculture-led food security and poverty reduction, and to partner countries' national policy objectives. P4P provided some measurable improvement in the capacity of farmer organisations and had important benefits in how WFP is viewed as a development partner by host governments. It contributed to increased corporate commitment by WFP to support FOs and small-scale production and has led to significant levels of procurement from FOs taking place through P4P approaches. At the FO level increased sales to buyers beyond WFP were observed in almost all countries where data were available. P4P benefited from very strong support from WFP management at the highest level and from the adaptation of internal systems and processes to facilitate implementation. The P4P evaluation also found that there was insufficient attention given at the design phase to the differentiation in farmers' groups (specifically smallholders farming less than 2 ha of land versus those with 2-5 ha or more), and to the full articulation of the theory of change and underlying assumptions. Impact assessments were conducted in three countries (El Salvador, Ethiopia and Tanzania). There was evidence of increased yields in El Salvador directly attributable to P4P, and of improved marketing capacity of farmers organizations in all three countries. Because of the lower-than-anticipated starting capacity of the FOs, the amount of capacity development improvement has been less and has taken longer to achieve, than was envisaged.

Critics of the P4P initiative stress that massive commodity market speculations are responsible for increasing the world food prices. This criticism is based on the idea that WFP purchases from smallholders would drive the global food price up, yet a study conducted by academics from Michigan State University states that WFP had no negative impact on local nor regional markets and that it effectively facilitated smallholders' access to markets.

== Anticipated transition ==
Olivier De Schutter finds that the way forward for P4P is the "up or out" strategy where farmers' organizations showing significant progress are eventually capable of producing and marketing their crops to buyers on their own and those who do not are simply dropped. P4P plans on linking pro-smallholder efforts to WFP programmes and operations, mainly the school feeding, nutritio-sensitive agriculture and resilience programming. Also, P4P is committed to work towards the empowerment of women, both in financial and social sense and towards awareness raising on benefits gender equality offers to agricultural communities. Finally, P4P is producing guidance, lessons and insights based on the pilot in order to offer WFP staff, governments, and other organizations, tools to support smallholders and work towards their development.
