= Place (surname) =

People:

- Etta Place (c.1878–?), companion of Butch Cassidy and the Sundance Kid
- Francis Place (1771–1854), English social reformer
- Godfrey Place (1921–1994), British naval officer
- Jacob C. Place (1828–1881), American politician
- Joanna Place (born 1962), COO of the Bank of England
- Martha M. Place (1849–1899), American murderer
- Mary Kay Place (born 1947), American actress, singer, director, and screenwriter
- Robert M. Place (born 1947), American artist and author
- Ullin Place (1924–2000), British philosopher and psychologist
