= Favored placement =

Favored placement (also known as preferred placement) is the practice of preferentially listing search engine results for given sites. It is also known as pay for placement, but this term usually refers to advertisements that appear along with relevant search results while favored placement affects the order of actual search results.

One of the earliest companies to use favored placement was Open Text Corporation for its Open Text Index search engine in 1996. However, the practice was met with complaints from consumers, and Open Text abandoned the idea within a few weeks.

In February 1998 GoTo.com, a project of Idealab, started using favored placement. The search engine ranked web sites depending on how much they are willing to pay to be listed at the top for a search term under a real-time competitive bidding process. Unlike Open Text, GoTo.com was more successful that after five months, more than a thousand sites were paying for favored placement. Yahoo! acquired GoTo.com (which was renamed Overture Services, Inc. at the time) and the service became Yahoo! Search Marketing.

As part of the Google-AOL deal in 2005, Google agreed to give favored placement to content from AOL throughout its site.

Benjamin Edelman, an assistant professor at Harvard Business School, claims that Google has "hard-coded" bias in the algorithm it employs to generate its OneBox results which are shown usually at the top when a query can be answered quickly or a direct link can be given. Edelman, states that in such cases, Google services such as Google Finance receive preferential listing over more popular finance sites such as Yahoo! Finance. However, Barry Schwartz, CEO of RustyBrick, points out that OneBox results are not organic and therefore should not been viewed as algorithmic.
