= Zubieta =

Coordinates: 43.126°N 1.741°W

- Zubieta, Spain
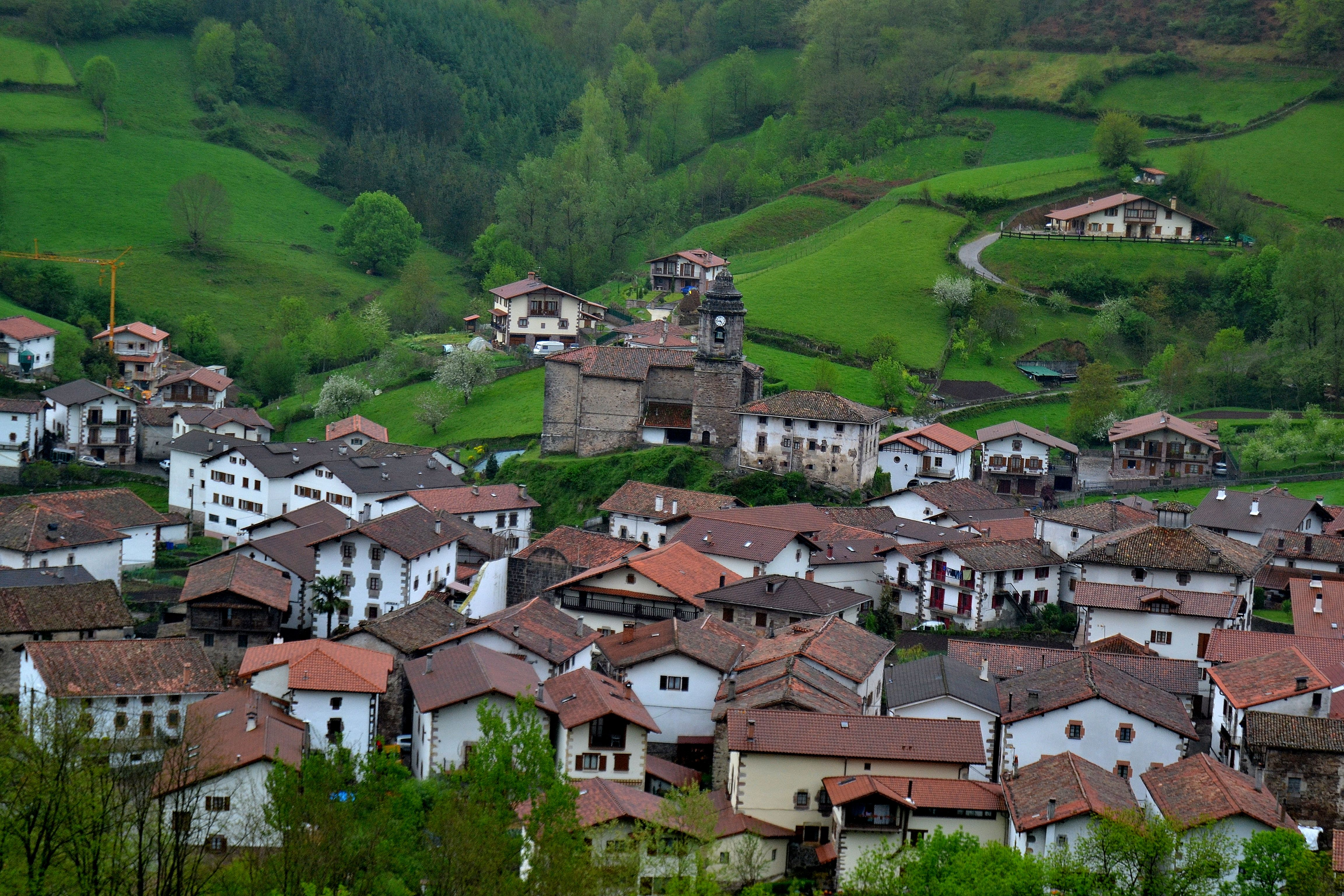
- Overlooking the town of Zubieta and its neighboring areas

- Coat of arms

- Map of Zubieta, Navarre
- Country: Spain

Zubieta is a town and municipality located in the province and autonomous community of Navarre, northern Spain.
