= Lantz, Navarre =

Coordinates: 42°59′56″N 1°37′10″W

Lantz
- Lantz, Navarre
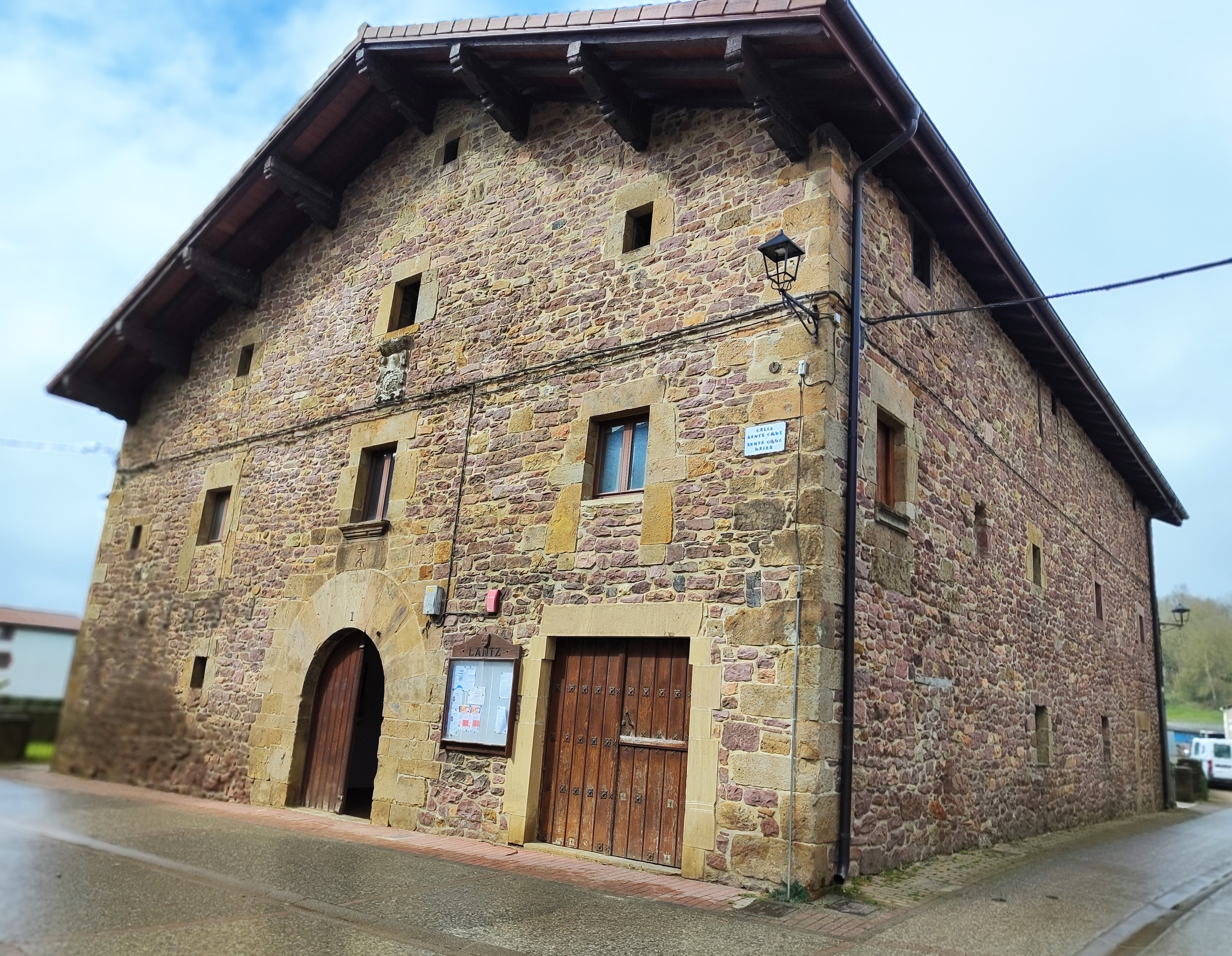
- Town hall

- Coat of arms

- Map of Navarre

Lantz is a town and municipality located in the province and autonomous community of Navarre, in the North of Spain.

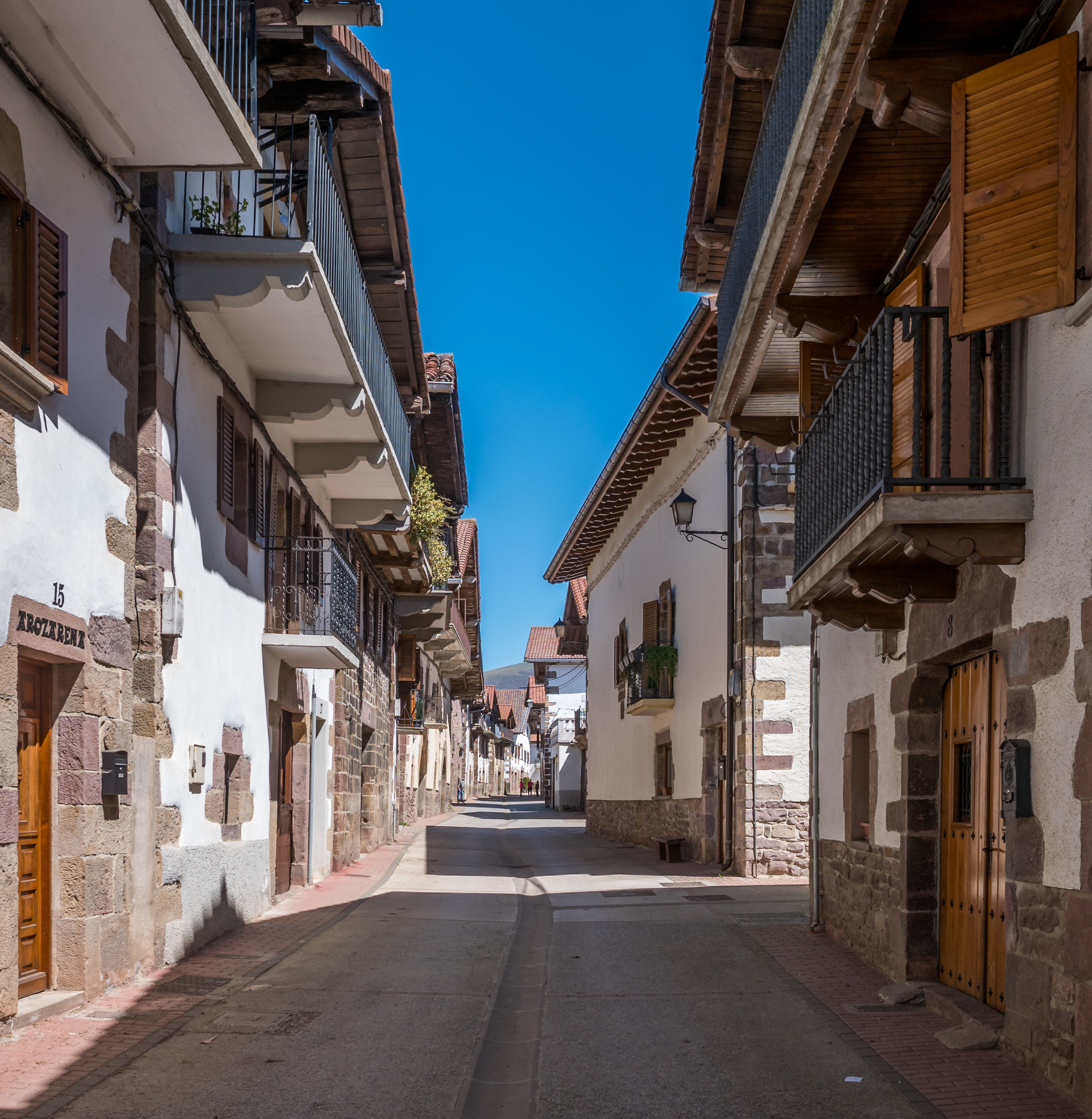
Streetview in Lanz, Navarre, Spain
