= List of municipalities in Gipuzkoa =

Map of Spain with Gipuzkoa highlighted

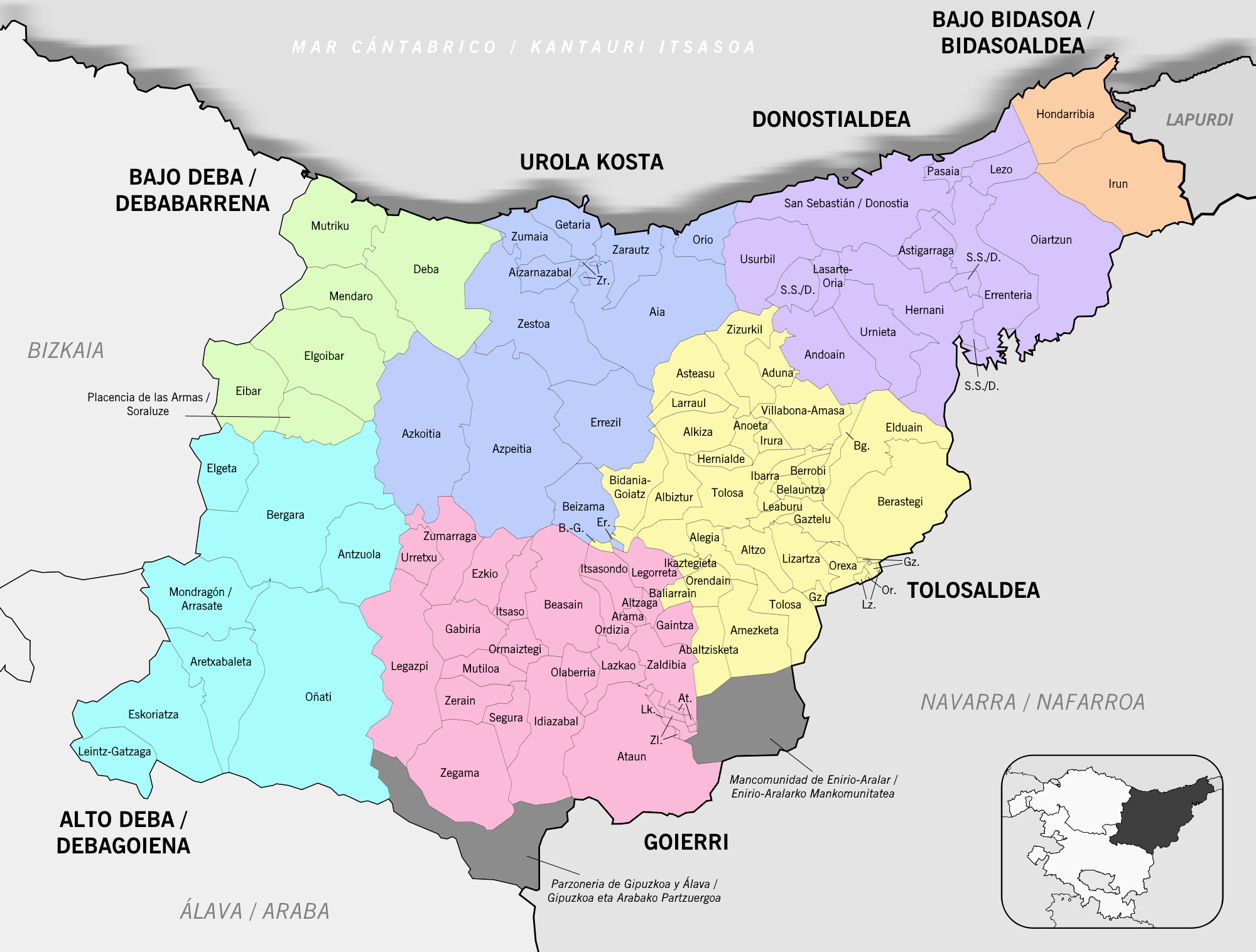
Map of the municipalities in the province of Gipuzkoa arranged by comarcas

Gipuzkoa is a province in the autonomous community of the Basque Country, Spain, that is divided into 88 municipalities. As of the 2023 Spanish census, the province is the 22nd largest by population with 726,712 inhabitants but is the smallest by land area spanning 1,909.03 square kilometres (737.08 sq mi). Municipalities enjoy a large degree of autonomy in their local administration. Amongst other tasks, they are in charge of urban planning, water supply, lighting, road network, local police and fire fighting.

Municipalities are the basic local political division in Spain, and can only belong to one province. The organisation of the municipalities is outlined in a local government law (Ley 7/1985, de 2 de abril, Reguladora de las Bases del Régimen Local) passed on 2 April 1985, completed by an 18 April 1986 royal decree. The Statute of Autonomy of the Basque Country of 1979 also contains provisions concerning the relations between the municipalities and the autonomous government of the Basque Country. All citizens of Spain are required to register in the municipality in which they reside. Each municipality is a corporation with independent legal personhood: its governing body is called the ayuntamiento (municipal council or corporation), a term often also used to refer to the municipal offices (city and town halls). The ayuntamiento is composed of the mayor (Spanish: alcalde), the deputy mayors (tenientes de alcalde) and the plenary assembly (pleno) of councillors (concejales). Municipalities are categorised by population for the purpose of determining the number of concejales: three when the population is up to 100 inhabitants, five for 101–250, seven for 251–1,000, nine for 1,001–2,000, eleven for 2,001–5,000, thirteen for 5,001–10,000, seventeen for 10,001–20,000, twenty-one for 20,001–50,000 and twenty-five for 50,001–100,000. One councillor is added for every additional 100,000 inhabitants, with a further one added when the number of concejales based on this methodology would be even in order to prevent tied votes.

The mayor and the deputy mayors are elected by the plenary assembly, which is itself elected by universal suffrage. Elections in municipalities with more than 250 inhabitants are carried out following a proportional representation system with closed lists, whilst those with a population lower than 250 use a block plurality voting system with open lists. The plenary assembly must meet periodically at the seat of the ayuntamiento, more or less often depending on the population of the municipality: monthly for those whose population is larger than 20,000, once every two months if it ranges between 5,001 and 20,000, and once every three months if it does not exceed 5,000. Many ayuntamientos also have a local governing board (Spanish: junta de gobierno local), named by the mayor from amongst the councillors—it is required for municipalities of more than 5,000 inhabitants. The junta de gobierno local, whose role is to assist the mayor between meetings of the plenary assembly, may not include more than one third of the councillors.

The largest municipality by population in the province of Gipuzkoa as of the 2023 Spanish census is San Sebastián, its capital, with 188,136 residents, while the smallest is Orexa with 109 residents. The largest municipality by area is Oñati, which spans 107.37 km^{2}, while Arama is the smallest at 1.32 km^{2}.

== Municipalities ==
Largest municipalities in Gipuzkoa by population

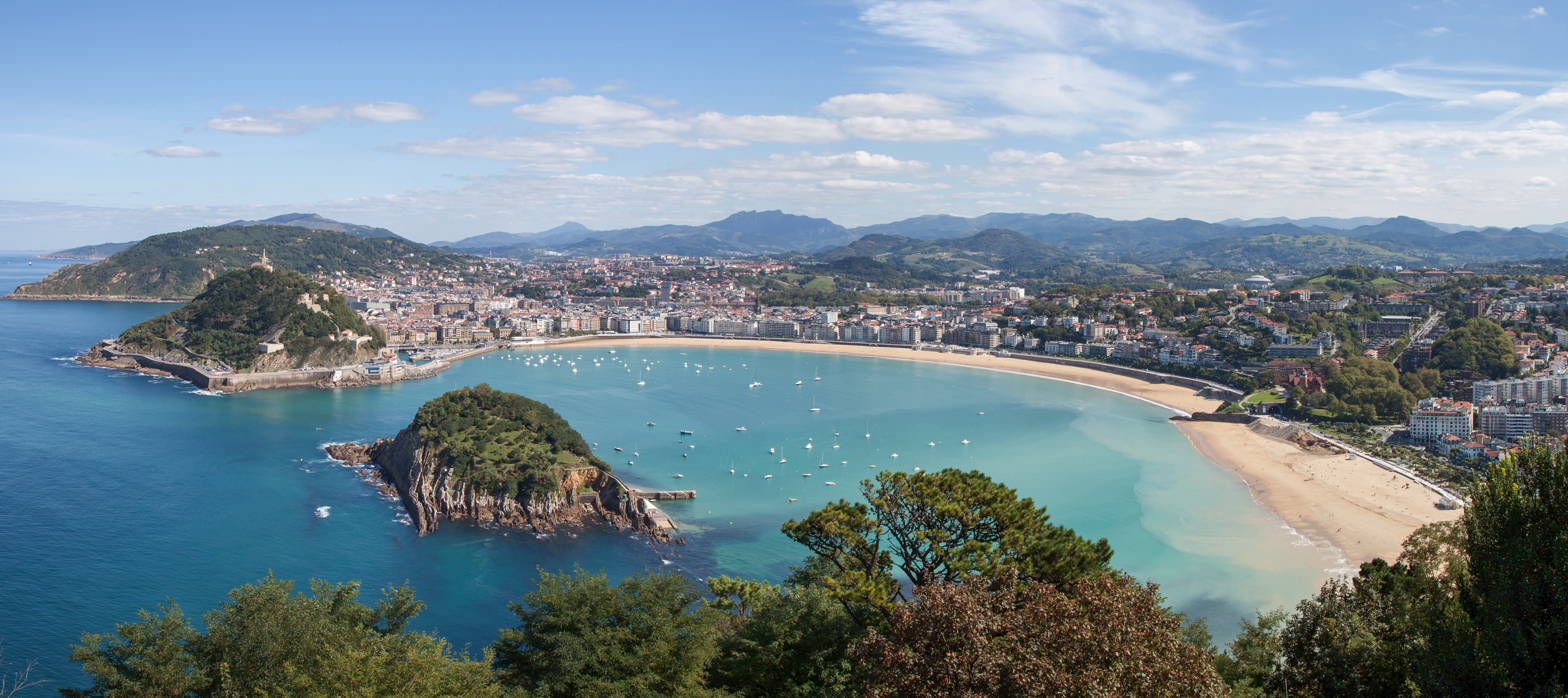
San Sebastián is the province's capital and largest municipality by population.

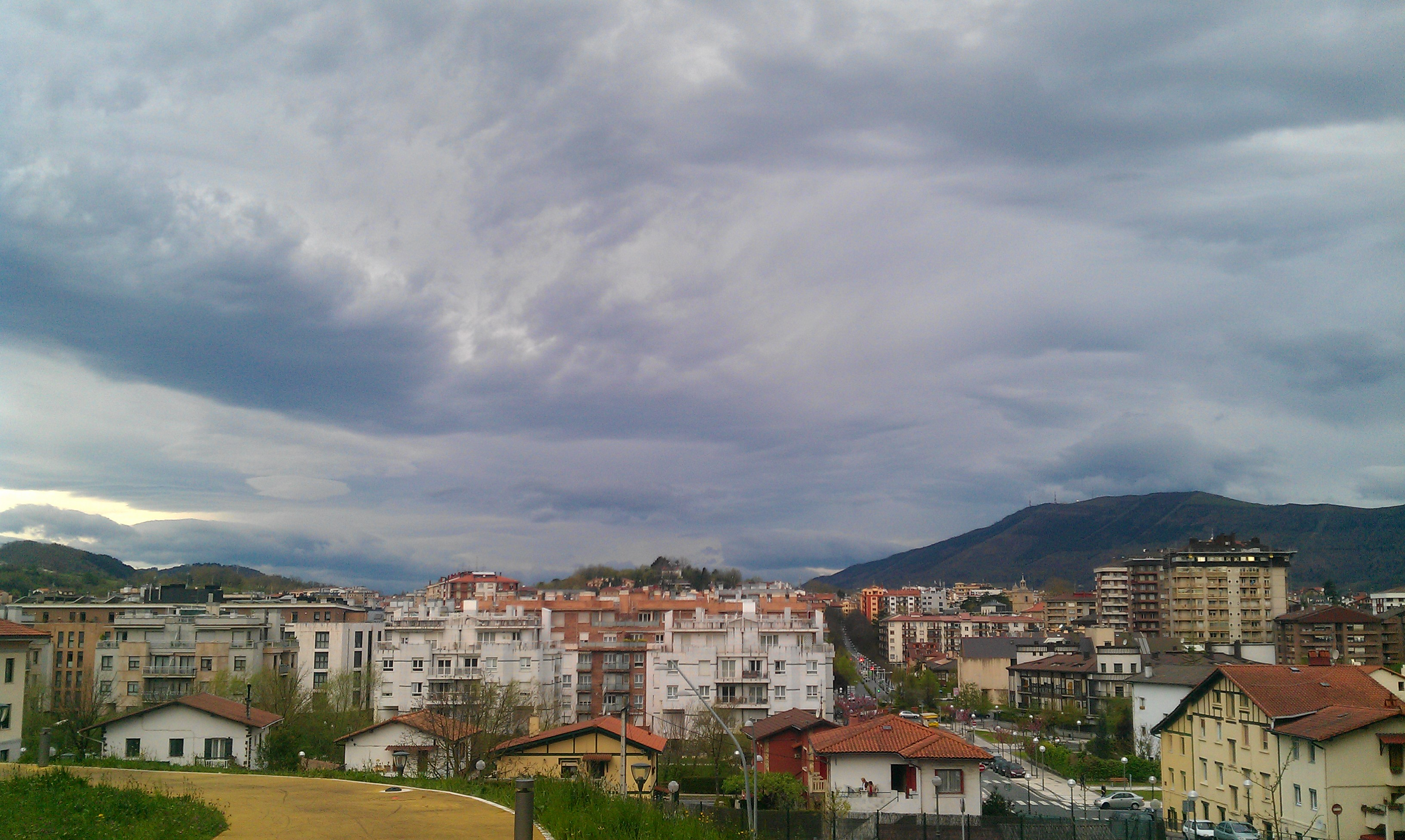
Irun, the second largest municipality by population in Gipuzkoa

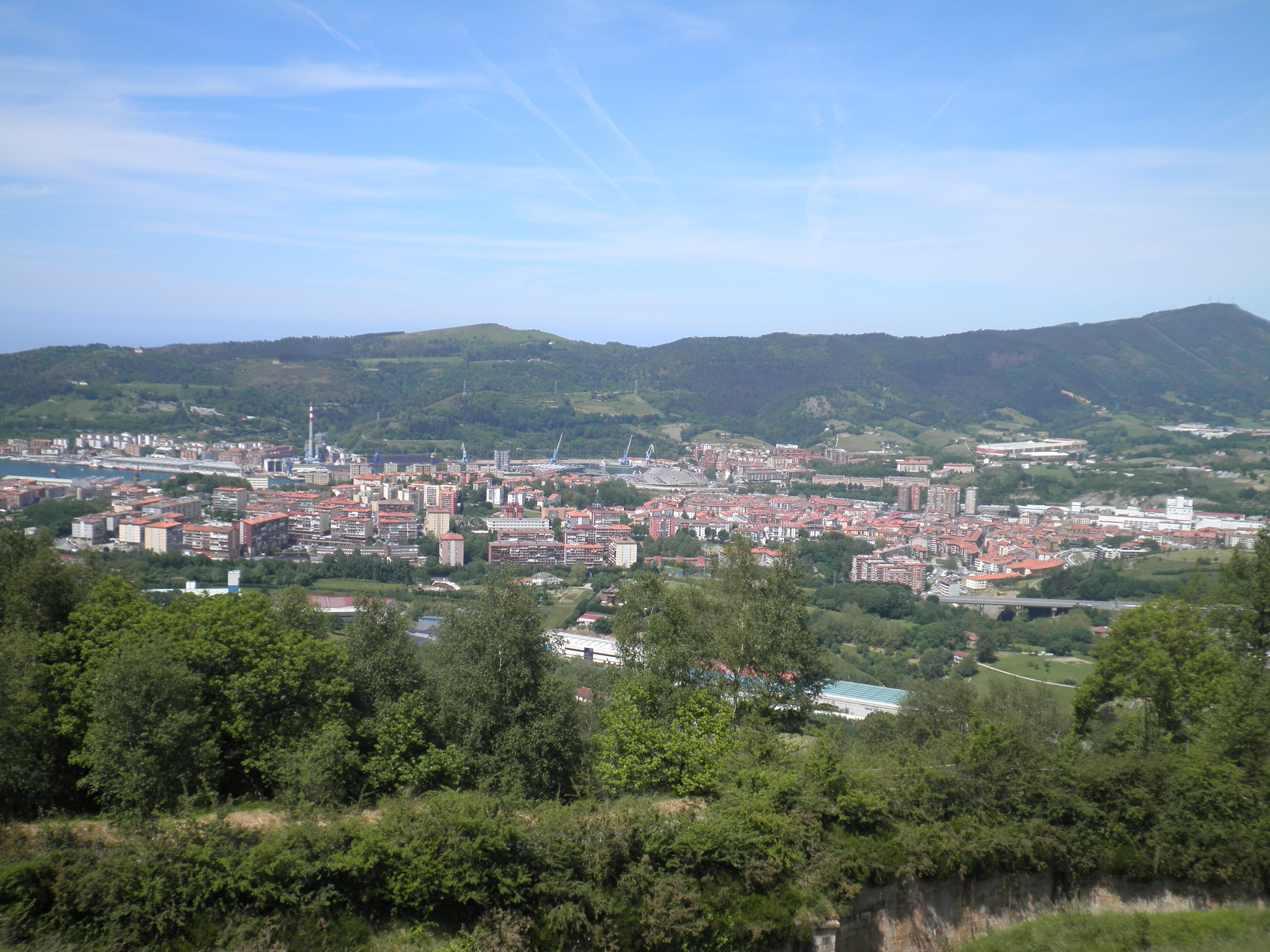
Errenteria is Gipuzkoa's third largest municipality by population.

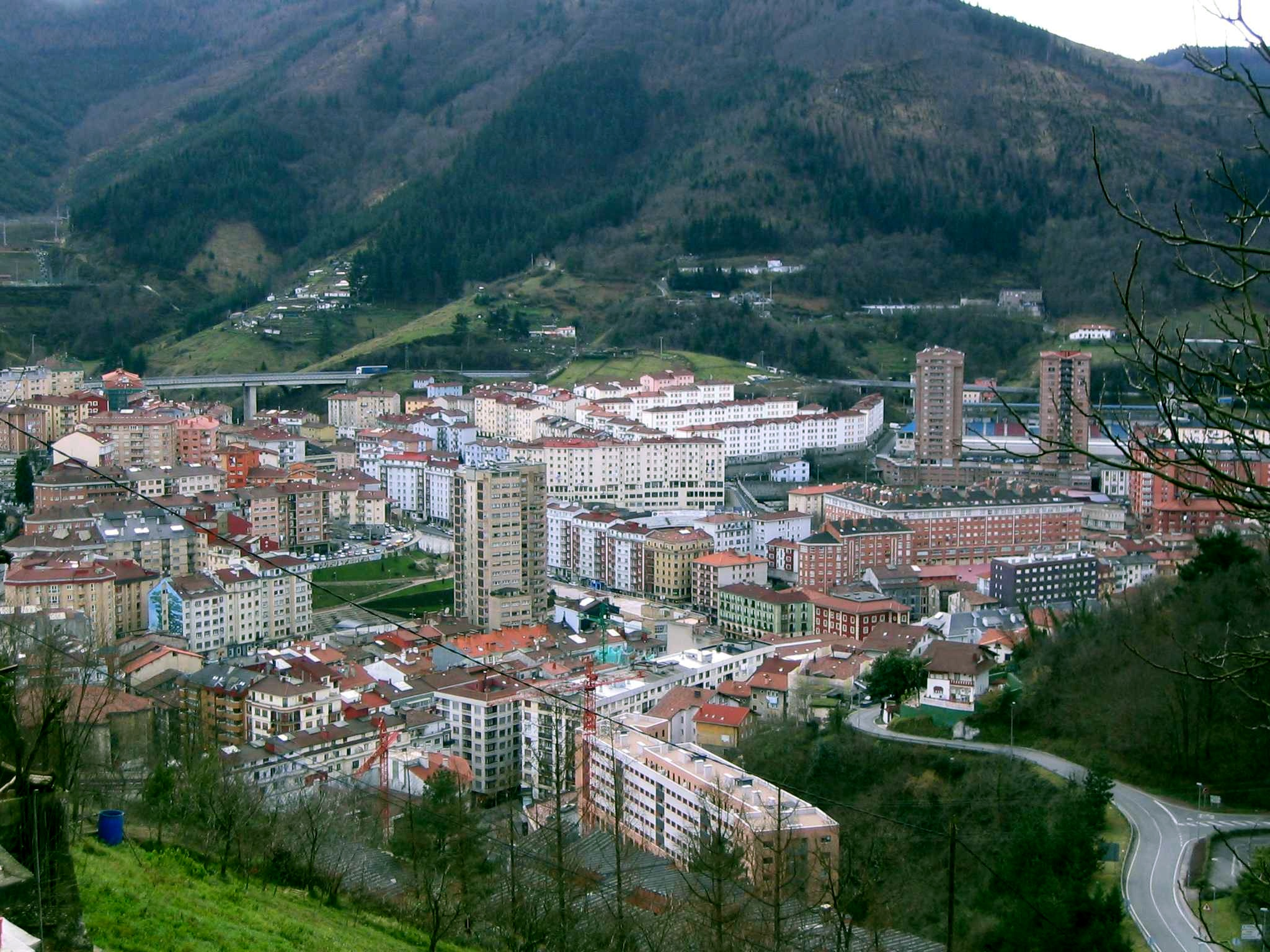
Eibar, Gipuzkoa's fourth largest municipality by population

† Provincial capital

Municipalities in Biscay
Name	Comarca	Population (2023 census)	Population (2011 census)	Population change	Land area (km^{2})	Population density (2023)
Abaltzisketa	Tolosaldea	326	320	+1.9%	11.18	29.2/km^{2}
Aduna	Tolosaldea	505	451	+12.0%	6.95	72.7/km^{2}
Aia	Urola Kosta	2,135	2,024	+5.5%	55.27	38.6/km^{2}
Aizarnazabal	Urola Kosta	771	761	+1.3%	6.55	117.7/km^{2}
Albiztur	Tolosaldea	325	313	+3.8%	13.01	25.0/km^{2}
Alegia	Tolosaldea	1,768	1,763	+0.3%	7.68	230.2/km^{2}
Alkiza	Tolosaldea	370	365	+1.4%	11.93	31.0/km^{2}
Altzaga	Goierri	173	161	+7.5%	2.52	68.7/km^{2}
Altzo	Tolosaldea	447	407	+9.8%	9.77	45.8/km^{2}
Amezketa	Tolosaldea	937	969	−3.3%	20.58	45.5/km^{2}
Andoain	Donostialdea	14,526	14,633	−0.7%	27.17	534.6/km^{2}
Anoeta	Tolosaldea	2,092	1,836	+13.9%	4.13	506.5/km^{2}
Antzuola	Debagoiena	2,082	2,153	−3.3%	27.73	75.1/km^{2}
Arama	Goierri	189	198	−4.5%	1.32	143.2/km^{2}
Aretxabaleta	Debagoiena	7,150	6,808	+5.0%	26.91	265.7/km^{2}
Asteasu	Tolosaldea	1,544	1,500	+2.9%	16.76	92.1/km^{2}
Astigarraga	Donostialdea	7,661	4,900	+56.3%	11.91	643.2/km^{2}
Ataun	Goierri	1,690	1,680	+0.6%	58.87	28.7/km^{2}
Azkoitia	Urola Kosta	11,608	11,394	+1.9%	54.71	212.2/km^{2}
Azpeitia	Urola Kosta	15,133	14,429	+4.9%	69.39	218.1/km^{2}
Baliarrain	Tolosaldea	149	125	+19.2%	2.70	55.2/km^{2}
Beasain	Goierri	13,908	13,719	+1.4%	29.99	463.8/km^{2}
Beizama	Urola Kosta	133	176	−24.4%	16.55	8.0/km^{2}
Belauntza	Tolosaldea	286	287	−0.3%	3.43	83.4/km^{2}
Berastegi	Tolosaldea	1,082	1,057	+2.4%	45.90	23.6/km^{2}
Bergara	Debagoiena	14,496	14,610	−0.8%	75.95	190.9/km^{2}
Berrobi	Tolosaldea	582	568	+2.5%	2.77	210.1/km^{2}
Bidania-Goiatz	Tolosaldea	538	536	+0.4%	13.37	40.2/km^{2}
Deba	Debabarrena	5,380	5,402	−0.4%	50.32	106.9/km^{2}
Eibar	Debabarrena	27,179	27,382	−0.7%	24.78	1,096.8/km^{2}
Elduain	Tolosaldea	237	232	+2.2%	25.07	9.5/km^{2}
Elgeta	Debagoiena	1,119	1,108	+1.0%	16.83	66.5/km^{2}
Elgoibar	Debabarrena	11,479	11,364	+1.0%	39.11	293.5/km^{2}
Errenteria	Donostialdea	39,134	39,228	−0.2%	32.26	1,213.1/km^{2}
Errezil	Urola Kosta	583	612	−4.7%	32.46	18.0/km^{2}
Eskoriatza	Debagoiena	4,187	4,032	+3.8%	40.25	104.0/km^{2}
Ezkio-Itsaso	Goierri	604	625	−3.4%	21.22	28.5/km^{2}
Gabiria	Goierri	504	483	+4.3%	14.88	33.9/km^{2}
Gaintza	Goierri	124	124	0.0%	5.96	20.8/km^{2}
Gaztelu	Tolosaldea	170	163	+4.3%	9.15	18.6/km^{2}
Getaria	Urola Kosta	2,870	2,659	+7.9%	10.63	270.0/km^{2}
Hernani	Donostialdea	20,423	19,260	+6.0%	39.81	513.0/km^{2}
Hernialde	Tolosaldea	312	359	−13.1%	4.17	74.8/km^{2}
Hondarribia	Bidasoa Behea	16,888	16,391	+3.0%	28.63	589.9/km^{2}
Ibarra	Tolosaldea	4,126	4,273	−3.4%	5.04	818.7/km^{2}
Idiazabal	Goierri	2,274	2,264	+0.4%	29.47	77.2/km^{2}
Ikaztegieta	Tolosaldea	486	469	+3.6%	2.00	243.0/km^{2}
Irun	Bidasoa Behea	62,853	60,747	+3.5%	42.40	1,482.4/km^{2}
Irura	Tolosaldea	1,888	1,626	+16.1%	2.99	631.4/km^{2}
Itsasondo	Goierri	654	675	−3.1%	8.94	73.2/km^{2}
Larraul	Tolosaldea	257	247	+4.0%	5.90	43.6/km^{2}
Lasarte-Oria	Donostialdea	19,103	17,830	+7.1%	6.01	3,178.5/km^{2}
Lazkao	Goierri	5,981	5,406	+10.6%	11.39	525.1/km^{2}
Leaburu-Txarama	Tolosaldea	392	388	+1.0%	3.50	112.0/km^{2}
Legazpi	Goierri	8,329	8,620	−3.4%	41.84	199.1/km^{2}
Legorreta	Tolosaldea	1,460	1,478	−1.2%	8.62	169.4/km^{2}
Leintz Gatzaga	Debagoiena	194	253	−23.3%	14.82	13.1/km^{2}
Lezo	Donostialdea	6,015	6,011	+0.1%	8.59	700.2/km^{2}
Lizartza	Tolosaldea	637	648	−1.7%	12.33	51.7/km^{2}
Mendaro	Debabarrena	2,008	1,960	+2.4%	25.39	79.1/km^{2}
Mondragón	Debagoiena	21,827	21,975	−0.7%	32.98	661.8/km^{2}
Mutiloa	Goierri	262	255	+2.7%	8.61	30.4/km^{2}
Mutriku	Debabarrena	5,302	5,053	+4.9%	27.69	191.5/km^{2}
Oiartzun	Donostialdea	10,310	10,012	+3.0%	59.49	173.3/km^{2}
Olaberria	Goierri	916	936	−2.1%	6.92	132.4/km^{2}
Oñati	Debagoiena	11,549	11,087	+4.2%	107.37	107.6/km^{2}
Ordizia	Goierri	10,580	9,751	+8.5%	5.66	1,869.3/km^{2}
Orendain	Tolosaldea	240	180	+33.3%	6.34	37.9/km^{2}
Orexa	Tolosaldea	109	123	−11.4%	5.85	18.6/km^{2}
Orio	Urola Kosta	6,122	5,319	+15.1%	9.81	624.1/km^{2}
Ormaiztegi	Goierri	1,226	1,318	−7.0%	6.77	181.1/km^{2}
Pasaia	Donostialdea	16,071	15,727	+2.2%	11.34	1,417.2/km^{2}
San Sebastián†	Donostialdea	188,136	185,512	+1.4%	60.89	3,089.8/km^{2}
Segura	Goierri	1,461	1,460	+0.1%	9.22	158.5/km^{2}
Soraluze-Placencia de las Armas	Debabarrena	3,742	3,973	−5.8%	14.22	263.2/km^{2}
Tolosa	Tolosaldea	20,045	18,389	+9.0%	37.39	536.1/km^{2}
Urnieta	Donostialdea	6,196	6,191	+0.1%	22.40	276.6/km^{2}
Urretxu	Goierri	6,733	6,927	−2.8%	7.71	873.3/km^{2}
Usurbil	Donostialdea	6,341	6,070	+4.5%	25.64	247.3/km^{2}
Villabona	Tolosaldea	5,812	5,858	−0.8%	17.74	3.3/km^{2}
Zaldibia	Goierri	1,734	1,504	+15.3%	16.44	105.5/km^{2}
Zarautz	Urola Kosta	23,127	22,513	+2.7%	14.35	1,611.6/km^{2}
Zegama	Goierri	1,540	1,539	+0.1%	35.07	43.9/km^{2}
Zerain	Goierri	282	266	+6.0%	10.37	27.2/km^{2}
Zestoa	Urola Kosta	3,777	3,631	+4.0%	43.69	86.4/km^{2}
Zizurkil	Tolosaldea	2,967	2,854	+4.0%	15.61	190.1/km^{2}
Zumaia	Urola Kosta	10,189	9,538	+6.8%	11.28	903.3/km^{2}
Zumarraga	Goierri	9,660	10,005	−3.4%	18.42	524.4/km^{2}
Gipuzkoa	—	726,712	708,425	+2.6%	1,909.03	380.7/km^{2}
Basque Country	—	2,216,302	2,185,393	+1.4%	7,092.45	312.5/km^{2}
Spain	—	48,085,361	46,815,916	+2.7%	504,755.17	95.3/km^{2}

== See also ==
- Geography of Spain
- List of municipalities of Spain
