= List of regions in Gipuzkoa =

Regions of the Spanish province of Gipuzkoa

The province of Gipuzkoa (Spanish: Guipúzcoa), in the Basque Country, Spain, is divided into regions known as comarcas (Basque: eskualdeak). These divisions are primarily defined by the local topography and follow the valleys formed by the province's main rivers: the Bidasoa, Oiartzun, Urumea, Oria, Urola, and Deba.

While the Basque Statistics Institute (Eustat) officially groups the municipalities into seven statistical regions (Bajo Bidasoa, Bajo Deba, Alto Deba, Donostialdea, Goierri, Tolosaldea, and Urola Kosta), the territory is more commonly divided into ten administrative regions for local mancomunidades, regional planning, and tourism purposes.

== List of regions ==
Region (Basque name)	Spanish name	Principal town	River basin
Bidasoaldea	Bajo Bidasoa	Irun	Bidasoa
Debabarrena	Bajo Deva	Eibar	Lower Deba
Debagoiena	Alto Deva	Arrasate/Mondragón	Upper Deba
Donostialdea	Comarca de San Sebastián	Donostia-San Sebastián	Lower Urumea / Oria
Goierri	Goyerri	Beasain / Ordizia	Upper Oria
Oarsoaldea	Oarsoaldea	Errenteria	Oiartzun
Tolosaldea	Tolosaldea	Tolosa	Middle Oria
Urola Erdia	Urola Medio	Azpeitia	Middle Urola
Urola Garaia	Alto Urola	Zumarraga	Upper Urola
Urola Kosta	Urola Costa	Zarautz	Lower Urola / Coast

== See also ==
- Comarcas of Spain
- Comarcas of the Basque Country
- List of municipalities in Gipuzkoa
