= Osakidetza =

Public healthcare agency in the Basque Country

Osakidetza-Basque Health Service
- Osakidetza-Servicio Vasco de Salud

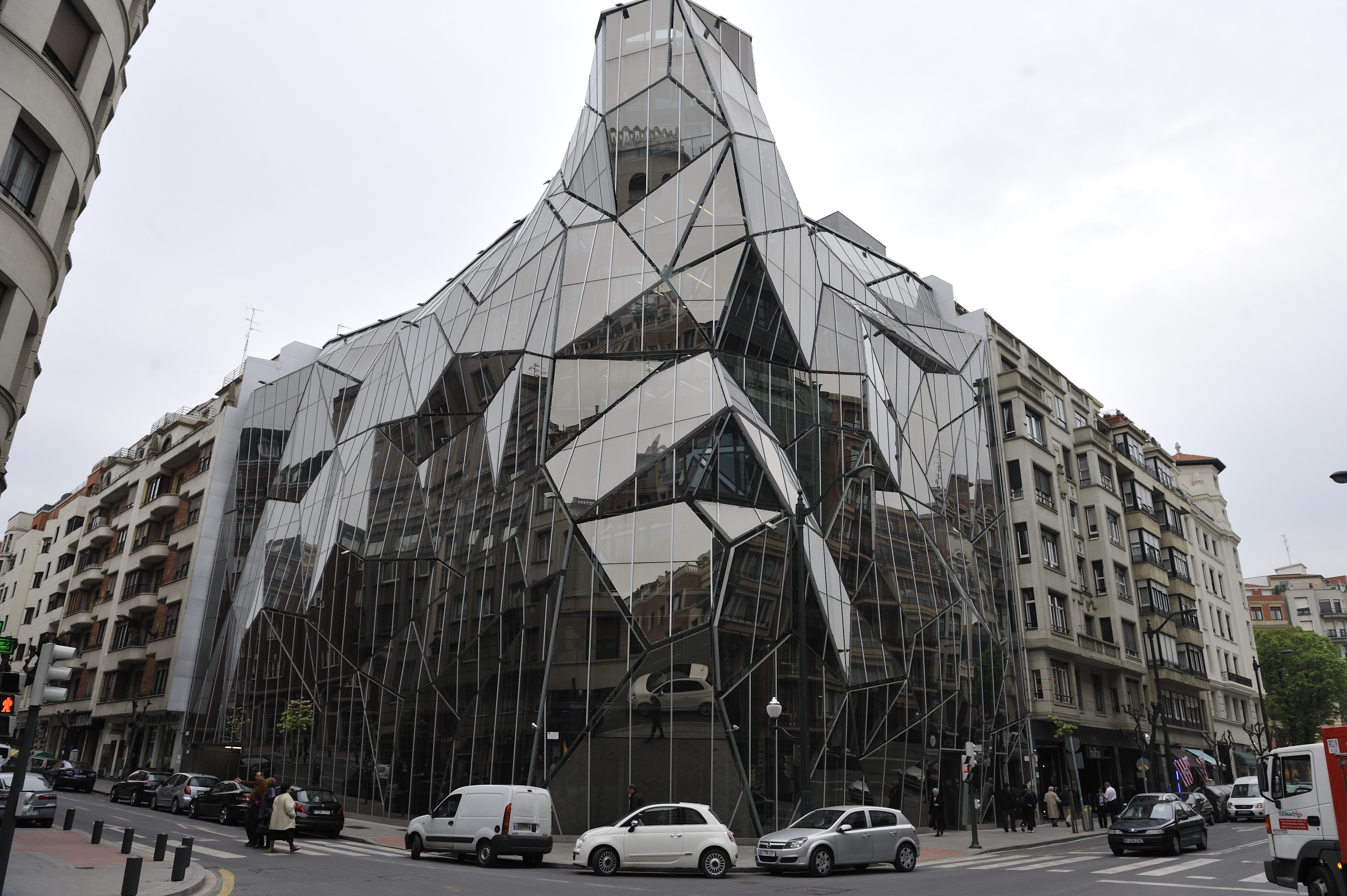
- Osakidetza headquarters, Bilbao.

Health Care Service overview
- Formed: 1984
- Preceding Health Care Service: Instituto Nacional de la Salud (INSALUD)
- Type: Public Provider
- Jurisdiction: Basque Government
- Headquarters: Bilbao, Biscay, Basque Country
- Health Care Service executive: María Jesús Múgica, Director Gerente
- Parent department: Department of Health
- Website: osakidetza

Osakidetza-Basque Health Service is the institution created in 1984 in charge of the public healthcare system in the autonomous community of the Basque Country, belonging to the National Health System, created in 1986 and that substituted INSALUD.

The transfer of responsibilities to the Basque government in matters of healthcare was done during the administration of Carlos Garaikoetxea as Lehendakari, after the approval of the Statute of Autonomy of the Basque Country in 1979. It is a public healthcare service with a great number of facilities that take care of the needs of the Basque citizens. Its chief is the Secretary of Health of the Basque Government.

== Main healthcare facilities ==
=== Araba ===
- Araba University Hospital
- Leza Hospital
- Araba Integrated Sanitary Organization
- Rioja Alavesa Integrated Sanitary Organization
- Araba Mental Health Network
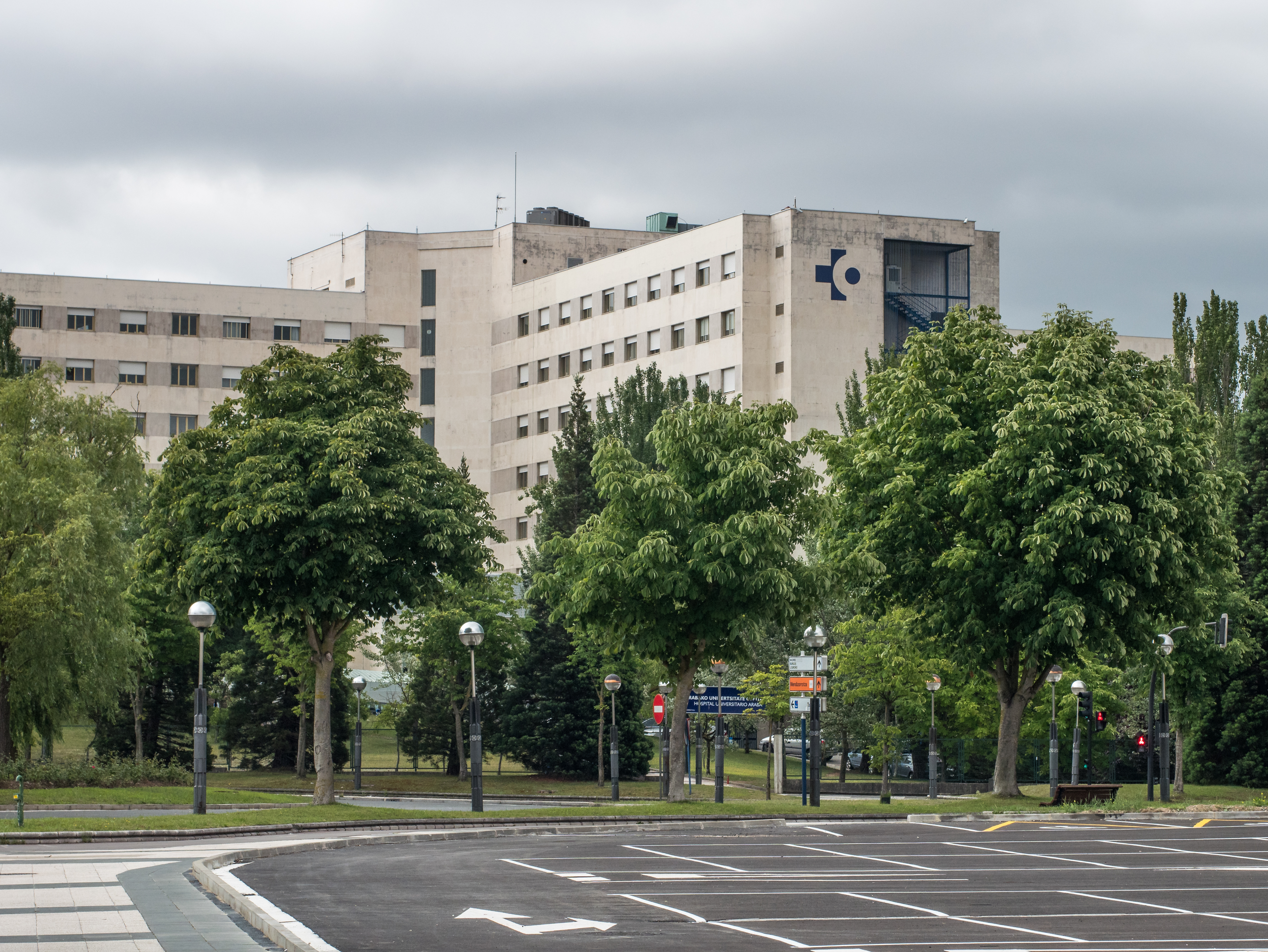
University Hospital of Araba (Txagorritxu), Vitoria-Gasteiz

=== Gipuzkoa ===
- Bidasoa Hospital
- Bidasoa Integrated Sanitary Organization
- Debabarrena Integrated Sanitary Organization
- Debagoiena Hospital
- Debagoiena Integrated Sanitary Organization
- Donostialdea Integrated Sanitary Organization
- Donostia University Hospital
- Eibar Hospital
- Gipuzkoa Mental Health Network
- Goierri-Alto Urola Integrated Sanitary Organization
- Mendaro Hospital
- Tolosaldea Integrated Sanitary Organization
- Zumarraga Hospital
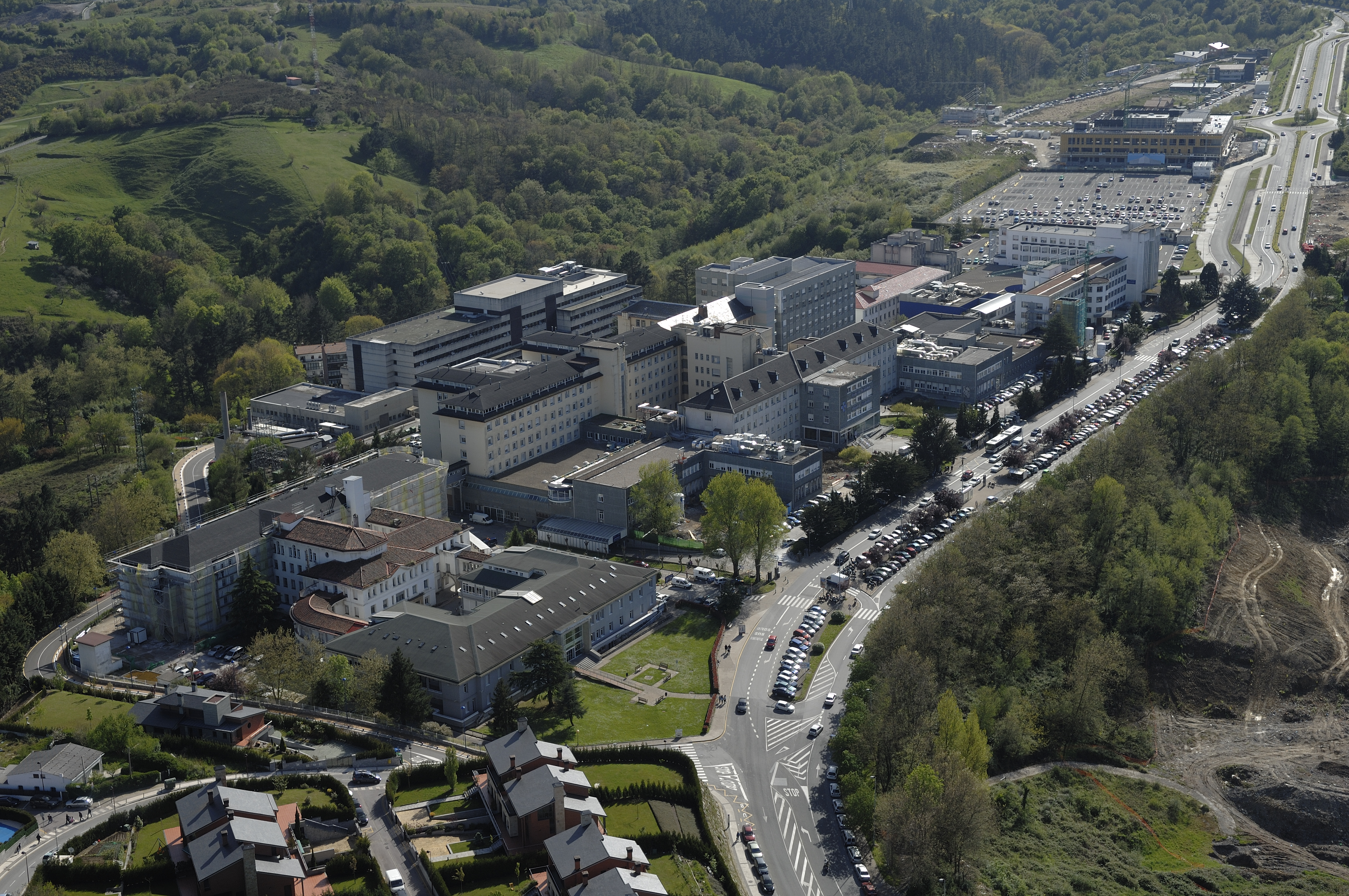
University Hospital Donostia

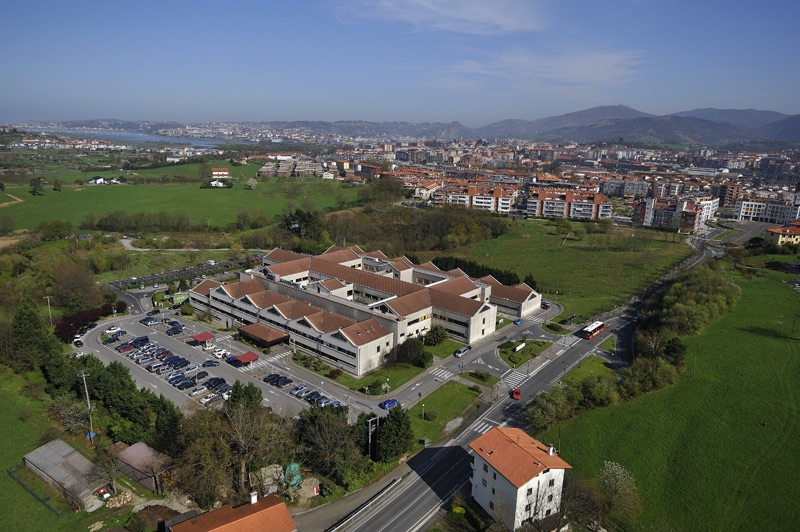
Hospital of the Bidasoa

=== Biscay ===
- Barakaldo-Sestao Integrated Sanitary Organization
- Barrualde-Galdakao Integrated Sanitary Organization
- Bilbao-Basurto Integrated Sanitary Organization
- University Hospital Basurto (Bilbao)
- Santa Marina Hospital (Bilbao)
- Cruces University Hospital (Barakaldo)
- San Eloy Hospital (Barakaldo)
- Biscay Mental Health Network
- Ezkerraldea-Enkarterri-Cruces Integrated Sanitary Organization
- Galdakao-Usansolo Hospital
- Gernika Hospital
- Gorliz Hospital
- Urduliz-Alfredo Espinosa Hospital
- Uribe Integrated Sanitary Organization
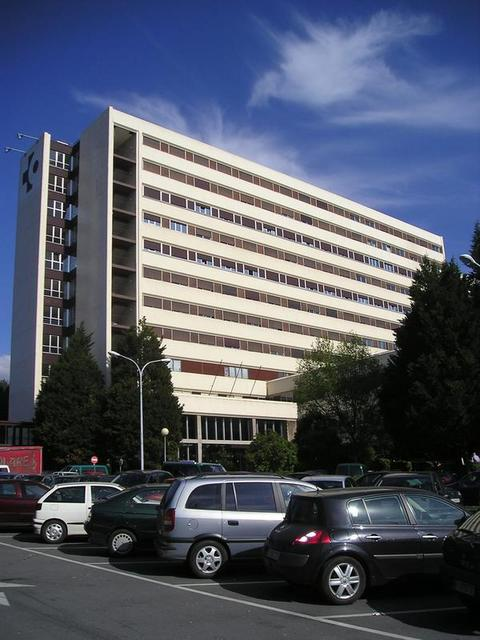
Hospital of Galdakao-Usansolo (Biscay)

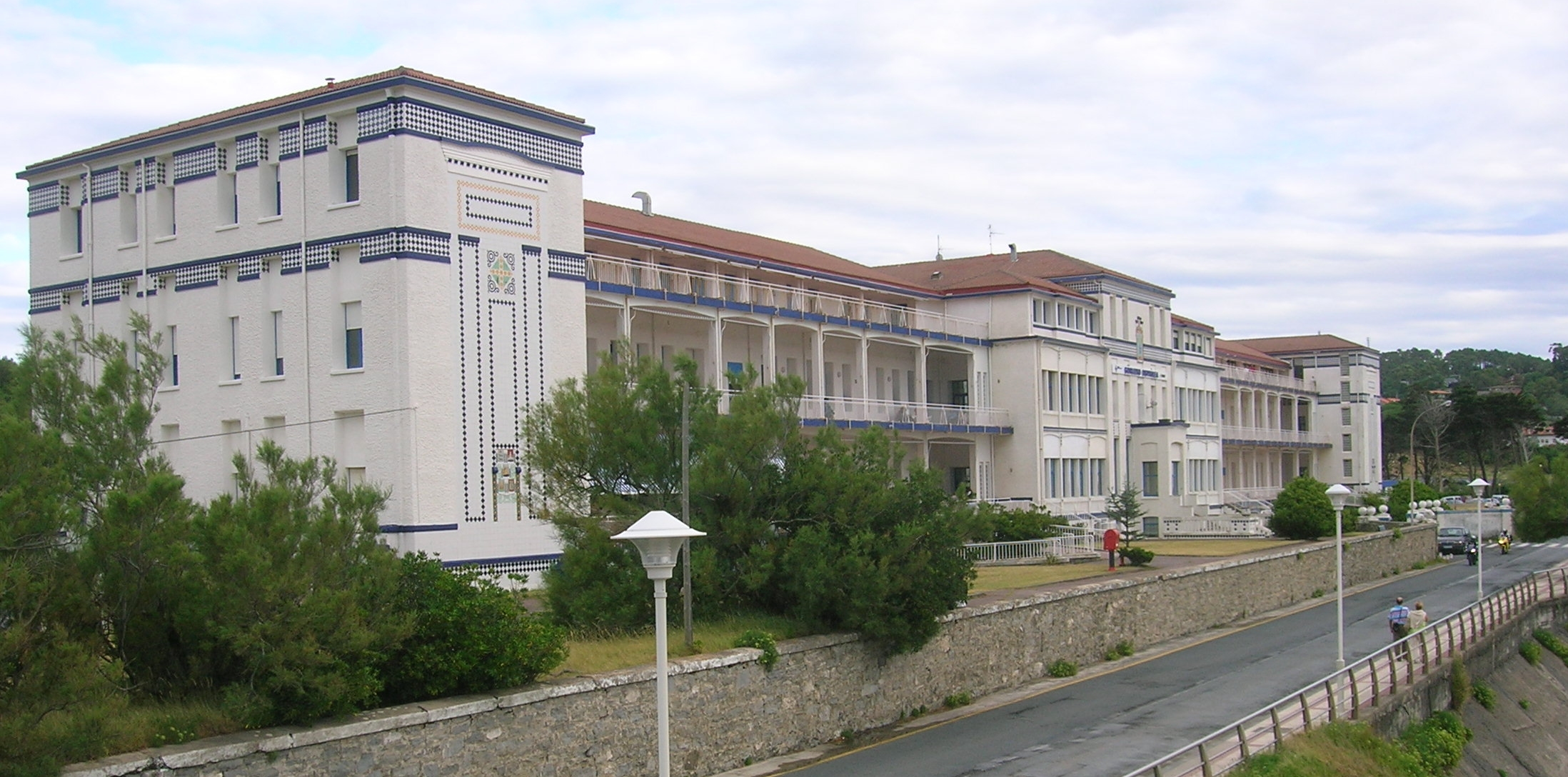
Hospital of Gorliz (Biscay)

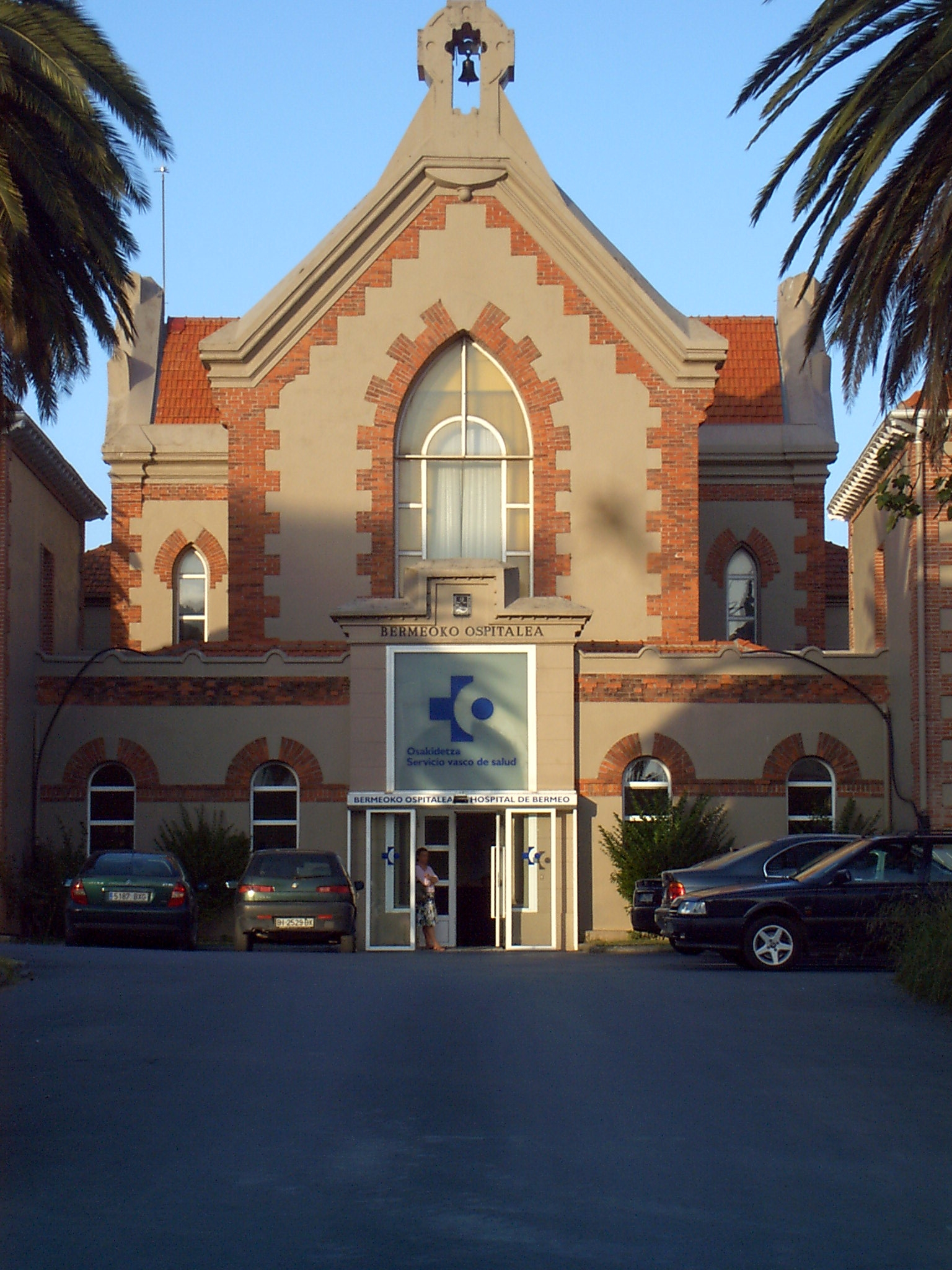
Mental Health Network of Biscay (Bermeo) (Biscay)

== See also ==
- Spanish National Health System
