= Eskoriatza =

- Municipality
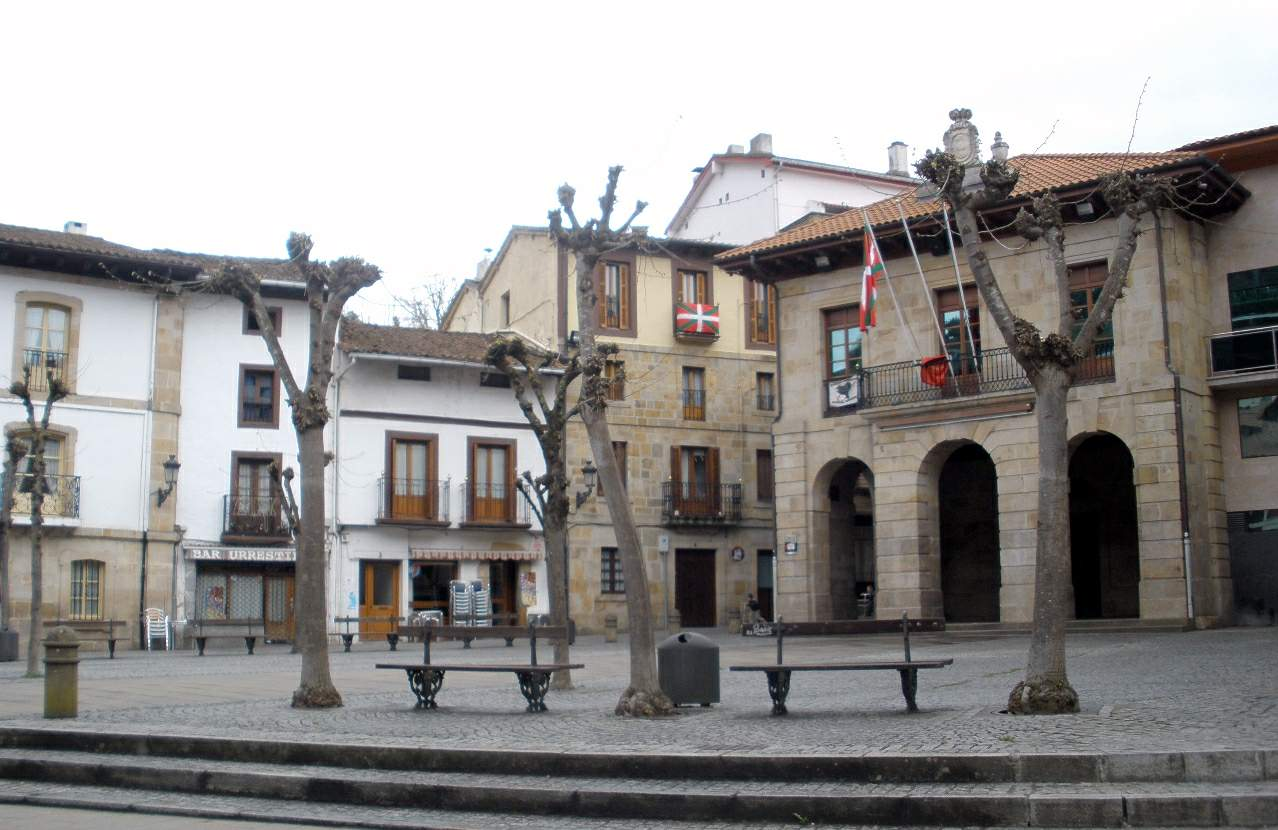

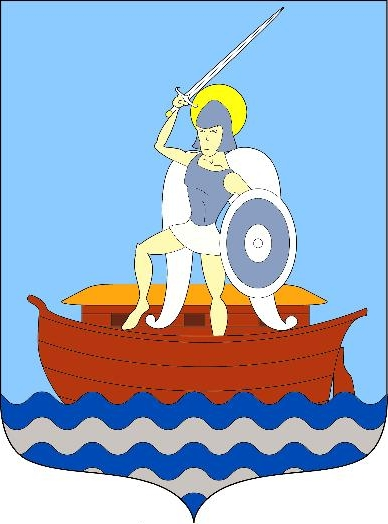
- Coat of arms

- Location of Eskoriatza within the Basque Country Eskoriatza (Spain)
- Coordinates: 43°01′01″N 2°31′42″W
- Country: Spain
- Autonomous community: Basque Country
- Province: Gipuzkoa
- Comarca: Debagoiena
- Founded: January 31, 1630

Government
  - Mayor: José Ramón Zubizarreta Alegría (PNV)

Area
  - Total: 40.43 km^{2} (15.61 sq mi)

Population (2025-01-01)
  - Total: 4,215
  - Density: 104.3/km^{2} (270.0/sq mi)
- Demonym: Basque: eskoitzarra
- Time zone: UTC+1 (CET)
  - Summer (DST): UTC+2 (CEST)
- Postal code: 20540
- Official language(s): Basque; Spanish
- Website: Official website

Eskoriatza is a town and municipality in Gipuzkoa, in the Basque Autonomous Community. It is located in the Debagoiena district, in the Leintz valley, surrounded by mountains such us Aitzorrotz and Kurtzebarri. It borders Aretxabaleta to the north and east, Aramaio to the west, and Leintz-Gatzaga and Arratzua-Ubarrundia to the south. The Deba River runs through the middle of the town, crossing it from south to north: it comes from Leintz-Gatzaga, and continues towards Aretxabaleta.

The main campus of the Faculty of Humanities and Education of Mondragon University is located in the town. Production facilities for various Mondragón cooperative businesses are located here.
