= Mondragón =

Mondragón Arrasate
- Municipality
- Arrasate / Mondragón
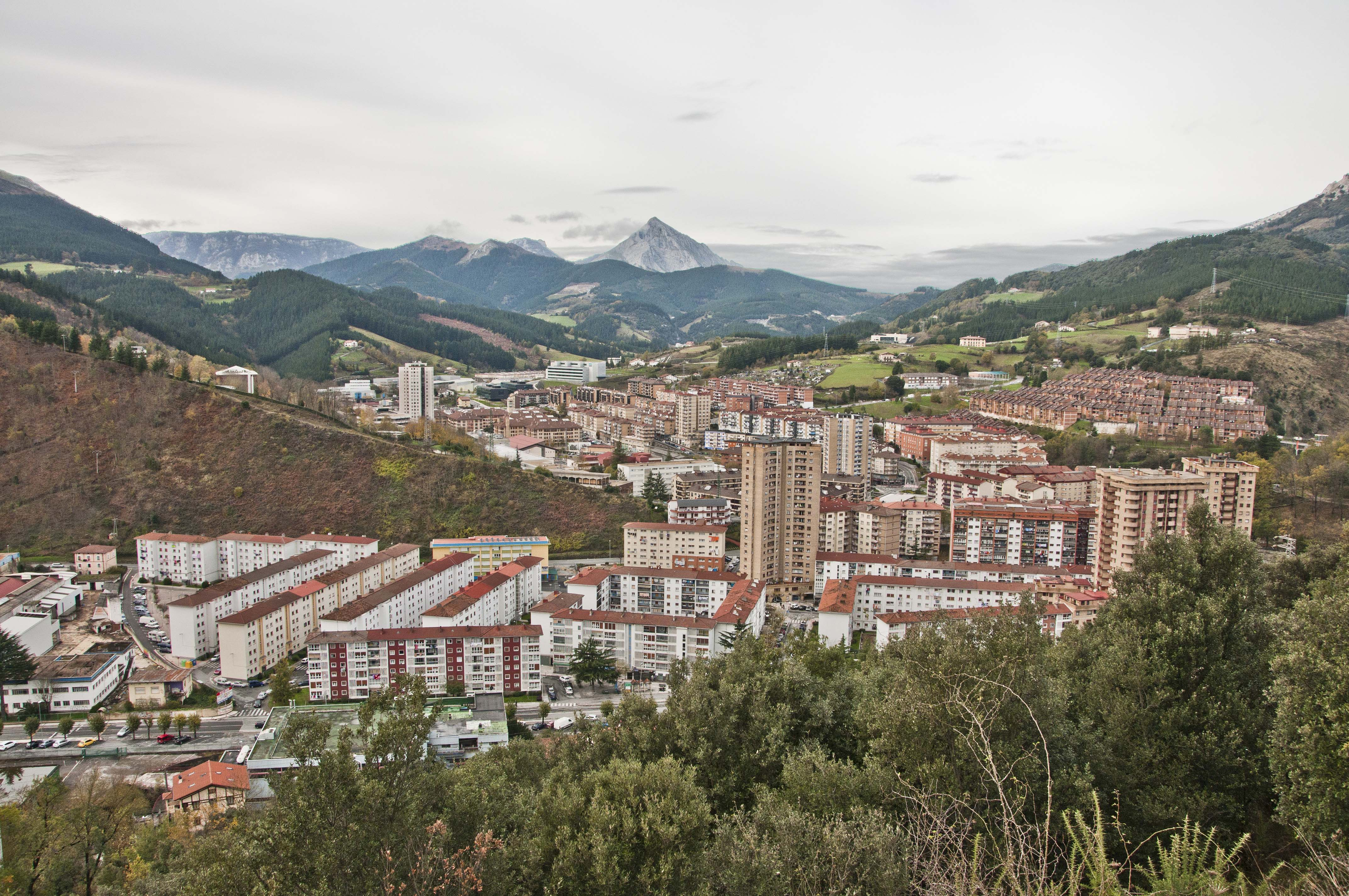
- San Andres neighbourhood of Mondragón with Anboto in the background

- Coat of arms

- Location of Mondragón within the Basque Country and within Spain Mondragón; Arrasate (Spain)
- Coordinates: 43°3′56.59″N 2°29′24.42″W
- Country: Spain
- Autonomous Community: Basque Country
- Province: Gipuzkoa
- Eskualdea: Debagoiena
- Founded: 15 May 1260
- Neighbourhoods: List: Herrigunea/Centro; Musakola; San Andres; Santa Marina; Uribarri

Government
  - Type: City Council
  - Mayor: Maider Morras (EH Bildu)

Area
  - Total: 30.80 km^{2} (11.89 sq mi)

Population (2025-01-01)
  - Total: 22,450
  - Density: 728.9/km^{2} (1,888/sq mi)
- Time zone: UTC+1 (CET)
  - Summer (DST): UTC +2
- Post code: 20500
- Area code: +34 943
- Website: www.arrasate.eus

Mondragón (in Basque: Arrasate) officially known as Arrasate/Mondragón, is a town and municipality in Gipuzkoa Province, Basque Country, Spain. Its population in 2015 was 21,933.

== Toponymy ==
The current official name of the municipality is Arrasate/Mondragón. This dual designation resolves a dispute that dates back several decades and establishes that the municipality is called both Arrasate and Mondragón in either of the two official languages, Spanish or Basque. In Basque, the term Mondragoe is also used, a Basque adaptation derived from the Romance Mondragón.

== Economic and historical significance ==
The town is best known as the birthplace of the Mondragon Corporation, the world's largest worker cooperative, whose foundation was inspired in the 1940s by the Catholic priest José María Arizmendiarrieta. In 2002 the MCC contributed 3.7% to the total GDP of the Basque Country and 7.6% to the industrial GDP.

The valley of the High Deba where the town is located enjoyed a high level of employment in the 1980s while the rest of the Basque industrial areas suffered from the steel crisis.

Noted poverty expert and sociology professor Barbara J. Peters of Stony Brook Southampton has studied the incorporated and entirely resident-owned town of Mondragón. "In Mondragón, I saw no signs of poverty. I saw no signs of extreme wealth," Peters said. "I saw people looking out for each other…. It's a caring form of capitalism."

The spa at Santa Águeda (now a psychiatric hospital) was the location of the 1897 murder of Spanish monarchist politician Antonio Cánovas del Castillo by Michele Angiolillo.

== Mondragon University ==
Mondragón serves as base of Mondragon University, a private university created in 1997, that is connected with the MCC companies. Almost all of the university's graduates find their first job within three months after completing their studies due to this strong link.

Mondragon University is divided into engineering, humanities, and enterprise faculties. The faculty of engineering is in Mondragon and Goierri. The humanities faculty is in Eskoriatza and the enterprise faculty is in Bidasoa and Oñati. The student enrollment is approximately 3,500 and is rapidly growing. The majority of the students are from Gipuzkoa and surrounding villages, although in the last few years, the number of students from Bilbao, San Sebastián, and the Basque Country capital, Vitoria-Gasteiz, has increased significantly.

== Politics and government ==
After the establishment of democracy, the first mayor elected in Mondragón was the nationalist José Antonio Ardanza, who served from 1979 to 1983 and later became lehendakari of the Basque government from 1985 to 1999.

== In film ==
Pierre Boutron's French language film Fiesta!, adapted from a novel written by José Luis de Vilallonga, was set in Mondragón during the Spanish Civil War.

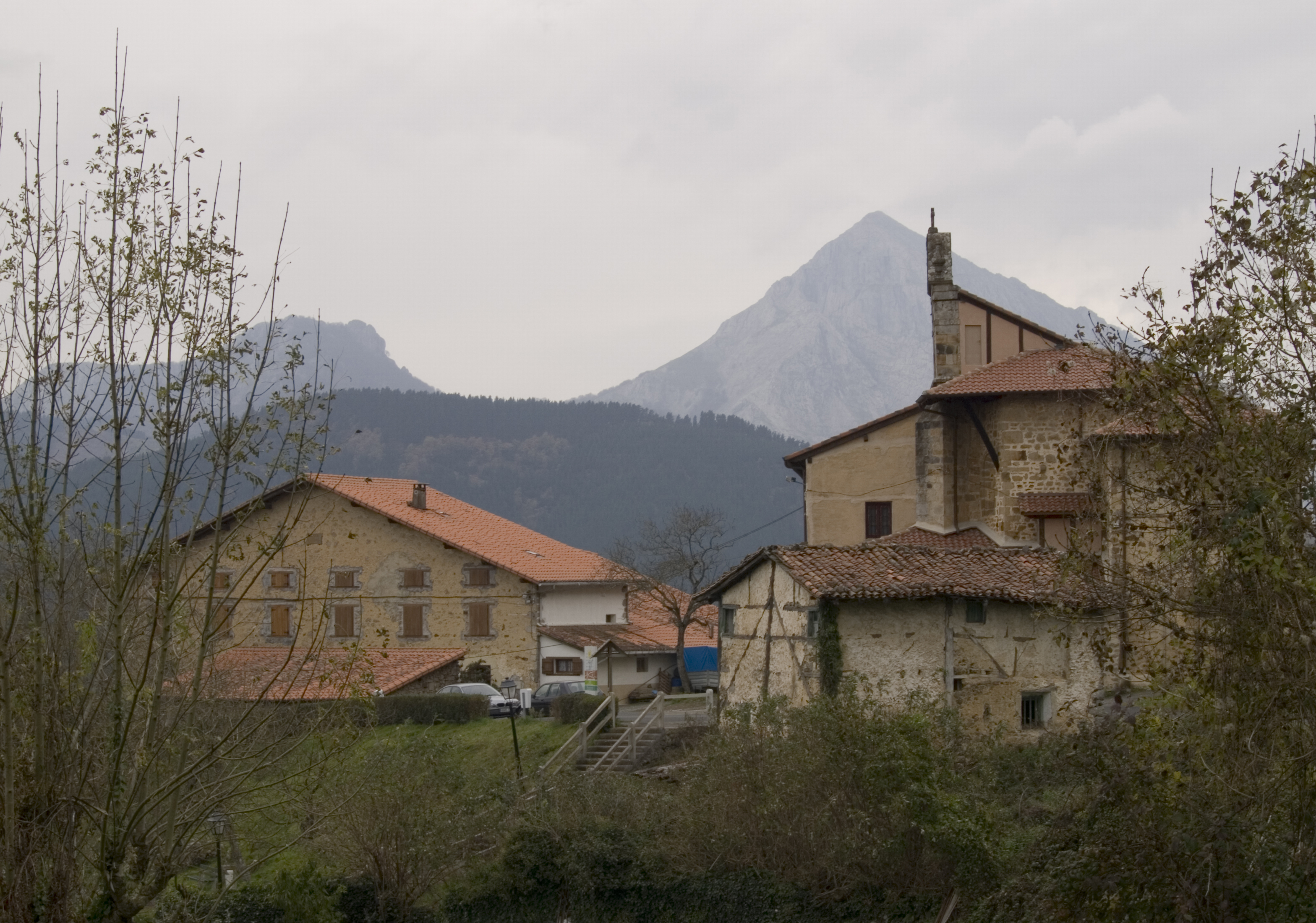
A country house near Mondragón.

== Archaeology ==
Excavating at the Artazu VII site located in the Kobate Quarry in Arrasate.
