= Mutriku =

Mutriku Motrico
- City and Municipality
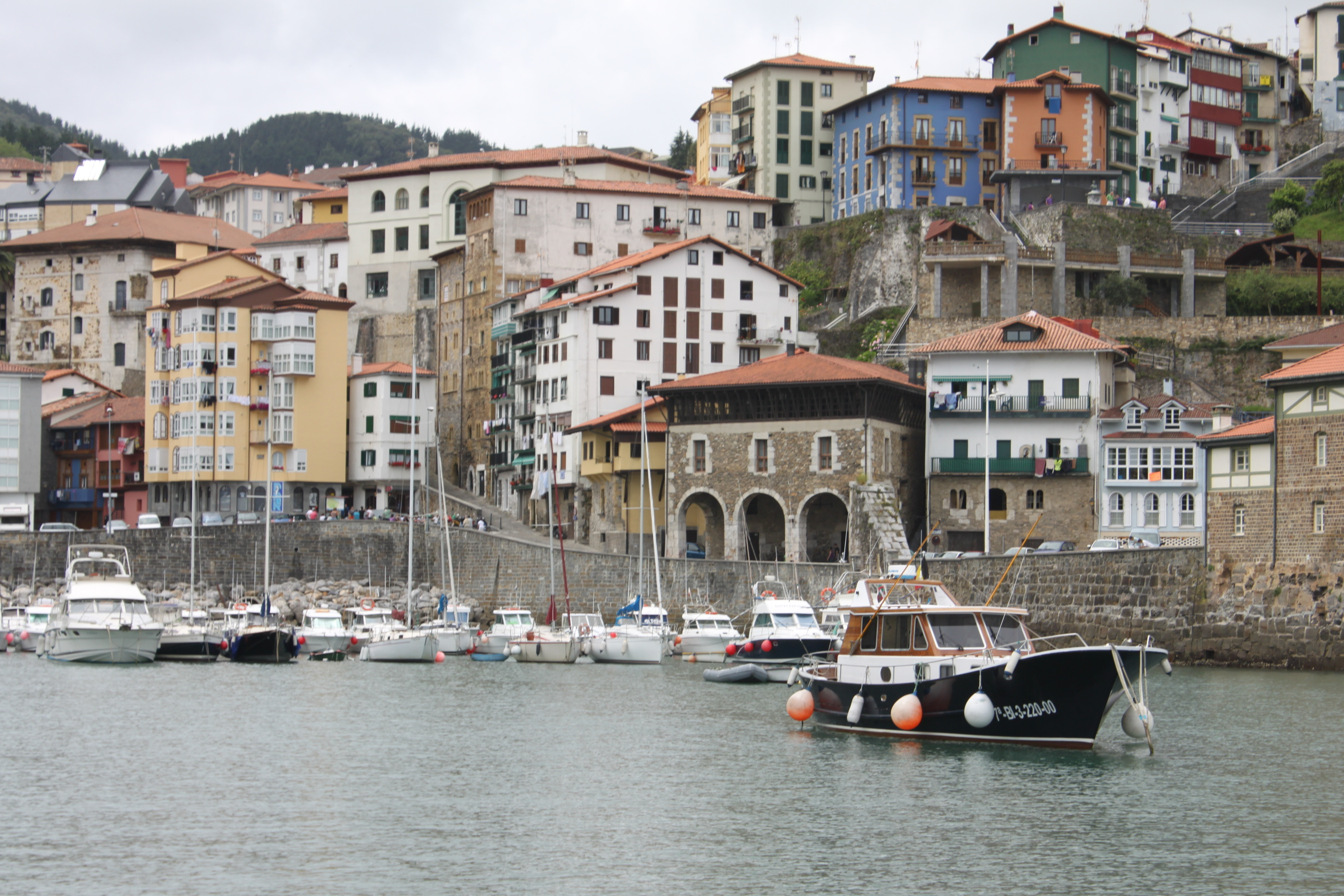
- Port of Mutriku

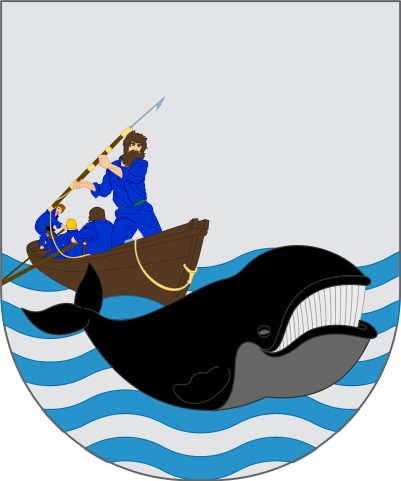
- Coat of arms

- Location of Mutriku in the Basque Country and Spain
- Coordinates: 43°18′26″N 2°23′6″W
- Country: Spain
- Autonomous Community: Basque Country
- Province: Gipuzkoa
- Comarca: Debabarrena

Government
  - Mayor: José Ignacio Palenzuela Arrieta (EH Bildu)

Area
  - Total: 27.7 km^{2} (10.7 sq mi)
- Elevation (AMSL): 49 m (161 ft)

Population (2025-01-01)
  - Total: 5,238
  - Density: 189/km^{2} (490/sq mi)
- Time zone: UTC+1 (CET)
  - Summer (DST): UTC+2 (CEST (GMT +2))
- Postal code: 20830
- Area code: +34 (Spain) + 943 (Gipuzkoa)
- Website: www.mutriku.eus

Mutriku (Spanish: Motrico) is a coastal town located in the province of Gipuzkoa in the Autonomous Community of Basque Country in northern Spain. It has a population of around 5000 and provides access to the Bay of Biscay. It is the site of the world's first multi-turbine breakwater wave power station, opened July 8, 2011. The Church of San Andrés can be found here, being one of the oldest churches in Gipuzkoa, dating to the year 1080.

== Etymology ==
Two different spellings are used for the town. Mutriku is the historical name as used by its inhabitants, but Motrico is the official spelling from the 13th century until 1980 on writing. In standard Basque language, the term Mutriku is used nowadays, the Basque spelling becoming official in 1980 by council decision. Since 1989, Mutriku has been the only official name accepted by the BOE, and it is used in modern official documents and in the Spanish-language media across the Basque region.

The town name's etymology has attracted much heated discussion. It is uncertain whether it was created before or at the founding of the town in 1209, although it seems to predate royal foundation as the 13th-century town charter mentions Motriko.

== Location and access ==
This small town lies on the coast of the Bay of Biscay, in the northwestern corner of Gipuzkoa. It is perched on rocky cliffs by the sea, and low tide reveals many bathing places and fishing spots. The town's beaches are located on the mouths of Deba and Artibai rivers. The name of the dark sand beach at the Deba's mouth is Ondarbeltz (hence the name, literally 'black sand' in Basque), while the beach at the mouth of the Artibai river is light gold in color. At the center of the village and halfway between the two river mouths lies a natural bay with the harbour. From the harbor there is a view of the whole town, dotted with medieval-style buildings.

=== Urban geography ===
Apart from the urban centre where the 85% of the population lives, the village contains 9 minor neighbourhoods as follows: Astigarribia, Artzain Erreka, Galdona, Ibiri, Laranga, Mijoa, Mizkia, Olabarrieta and Olatz.

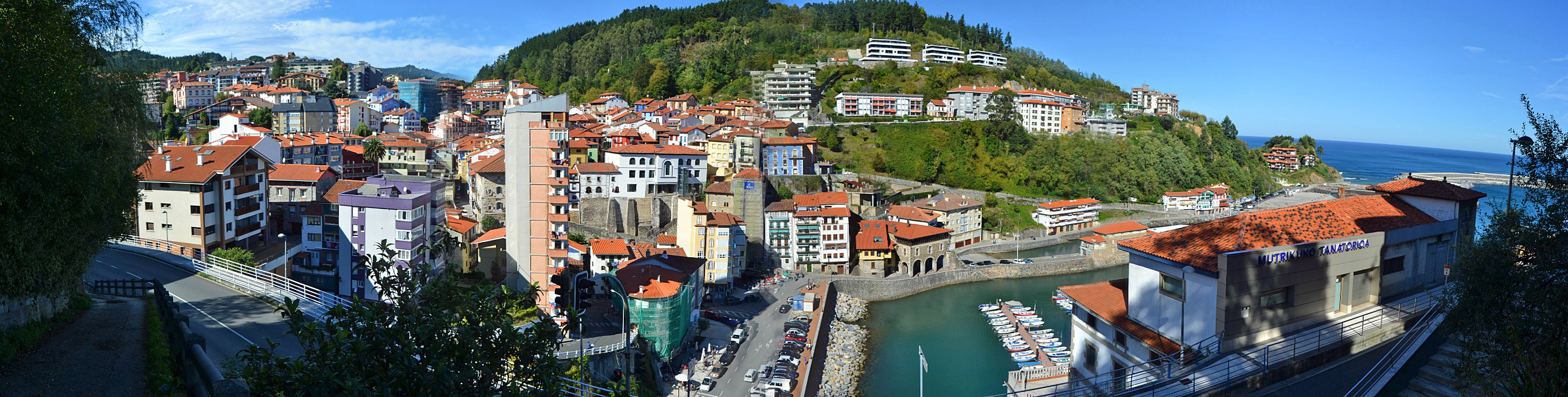
Panorama of Mutriku

== Hydrography and terrain ==
=== Hydrography ===
The river Deba is the limit of the town to the east; some small rivulets flow from the village to it as the Olatzgoiko erreka, the Ainoerreka, Jarrolatza erreka and Txokorrekua. On the western boundary lies the Artibai, although in this case the river from city limit is the Mijoaerreka race that leads Saturraran beach in the bay at the mouth of Artibai. The Saturraran forms a small basin that collects water from Olatz and surrounding mountains with rivers: Errekabeltz, Armentxako erreka, Zinoaetxeberriko erreka, Artzainerreka, Aldaberreka, Bidekoaerreka, Ondaberroerreka and Kurpitako erreka. Between these two watersheds, Deba and the Saturraran, another small basin that forms a small river that runs down from Kalbario and the valley which sits the town center and surrounding areas, these are: Errekaundi, Idurreko erreka, Leizarreko erreka, Maldomin erreka, Xoxuarterreka and Lasaoko erreka.

Saturraran beach

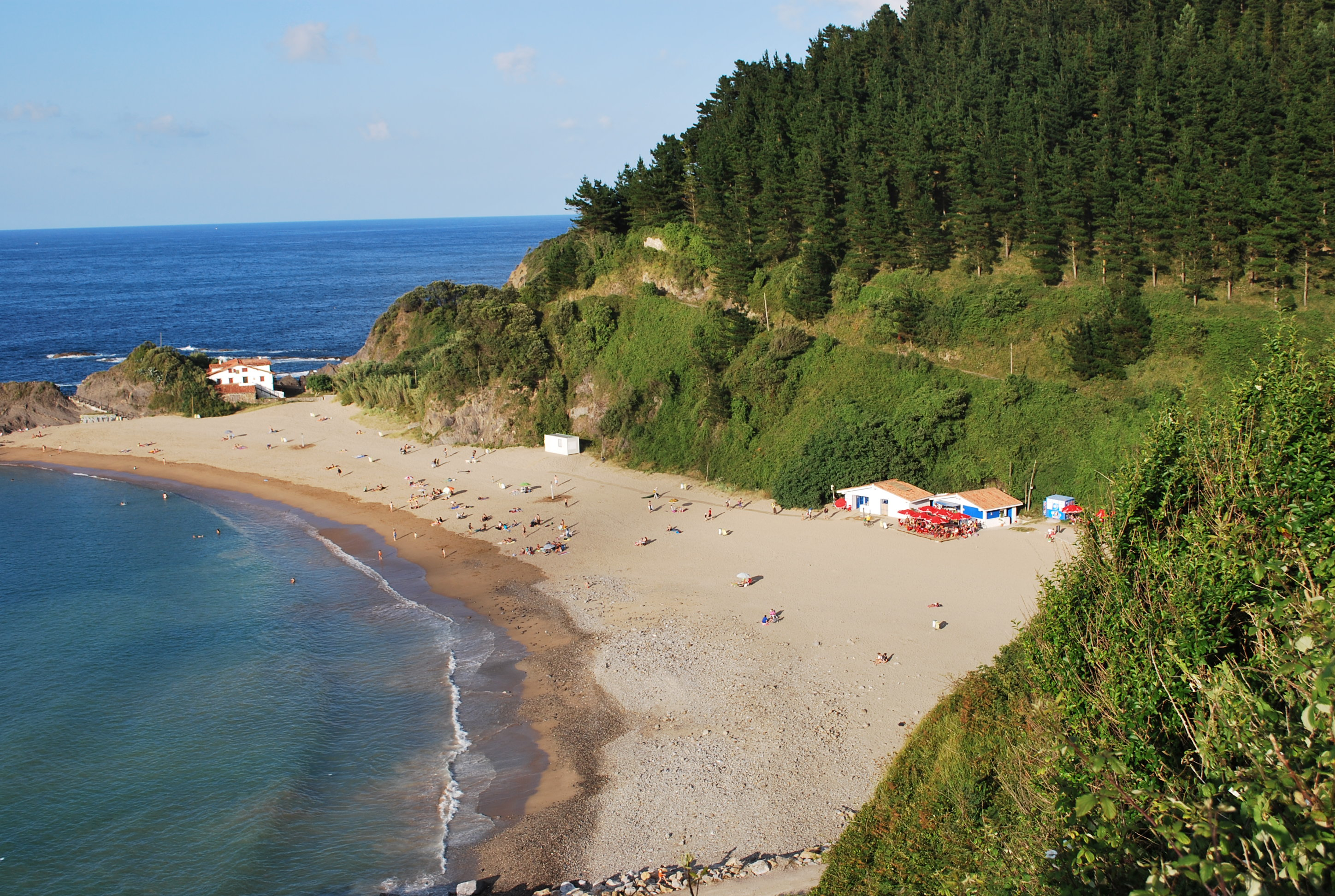

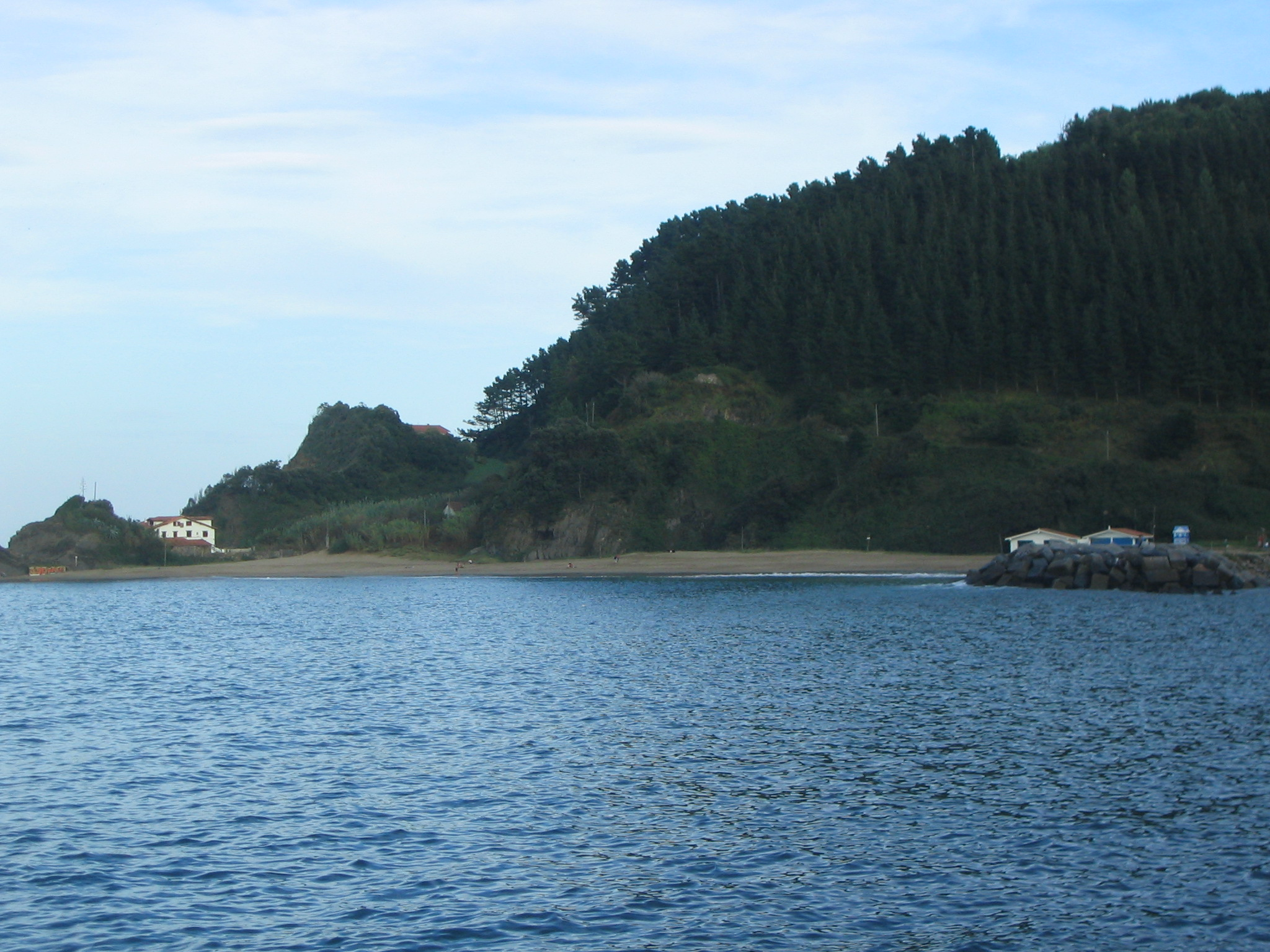

=== Terrain ===
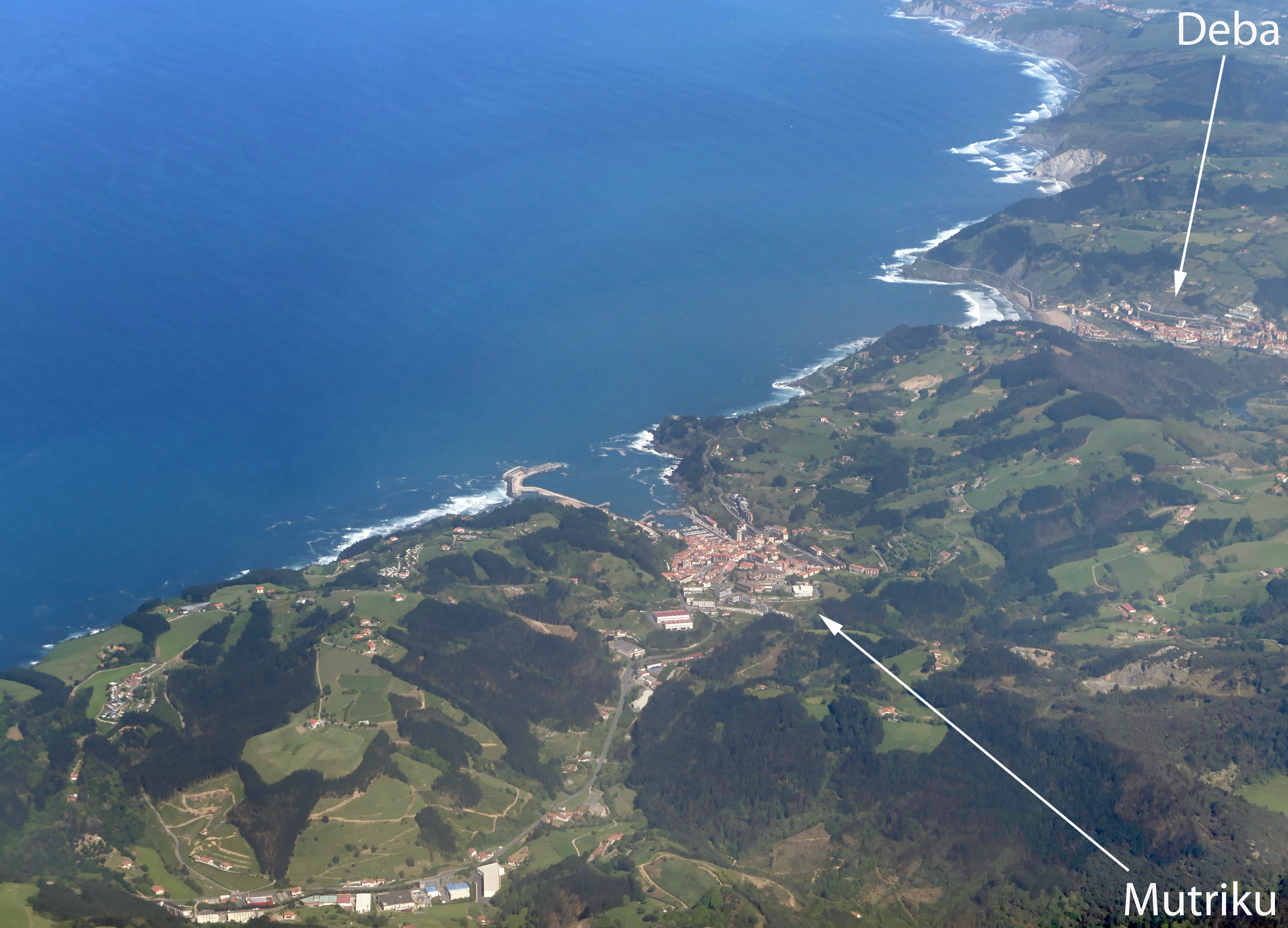
An aerial view.

The topography of Mutriku is marked by Mt. Arno (608 m), which rises above the town. It is a mass of limestone covered with oak and native conifer Cantabrian forest. The terrain is very rugged, with steep slopes and narrow valleys extending down to the coastline, cliffs, and tidal region of Guipuzcoa.

== Economy ==
Mutriku's economy is tied to the sea. Fishing has historically been the main economic driver, providing the raw material for canning factories. The fishing sector has been greatly affected by the economic crisis; only a few inshore fishing boats remain. Agriculture in the rural districts is for subsistence and local consumption; surplus crops are sold in regional markets. Little livestock is present. Logging in rural areas focuses on insignis pine and other conifers.

Supplements to the fishing sector are still developing. The canning industry, historically the main town industry, has given way to all kinds of metal processing workshops that export regionally. Flat land at the Saturraran river mouth has provided development space. The main business of the municipality is currently the canning factory Yurrita e Hijos SA,; Metec Motric SA, which manufactures medical instruments, and the Katealegaia workshop for those with disabilities are other major employers

The service sector is heavily dependent on tourism. Mutriku has several campgrounds and many restaurants which also cater to those visiting the neighboring town of Deba. It has also become a popular location for vacation homes for those in larger cities.

== History ==
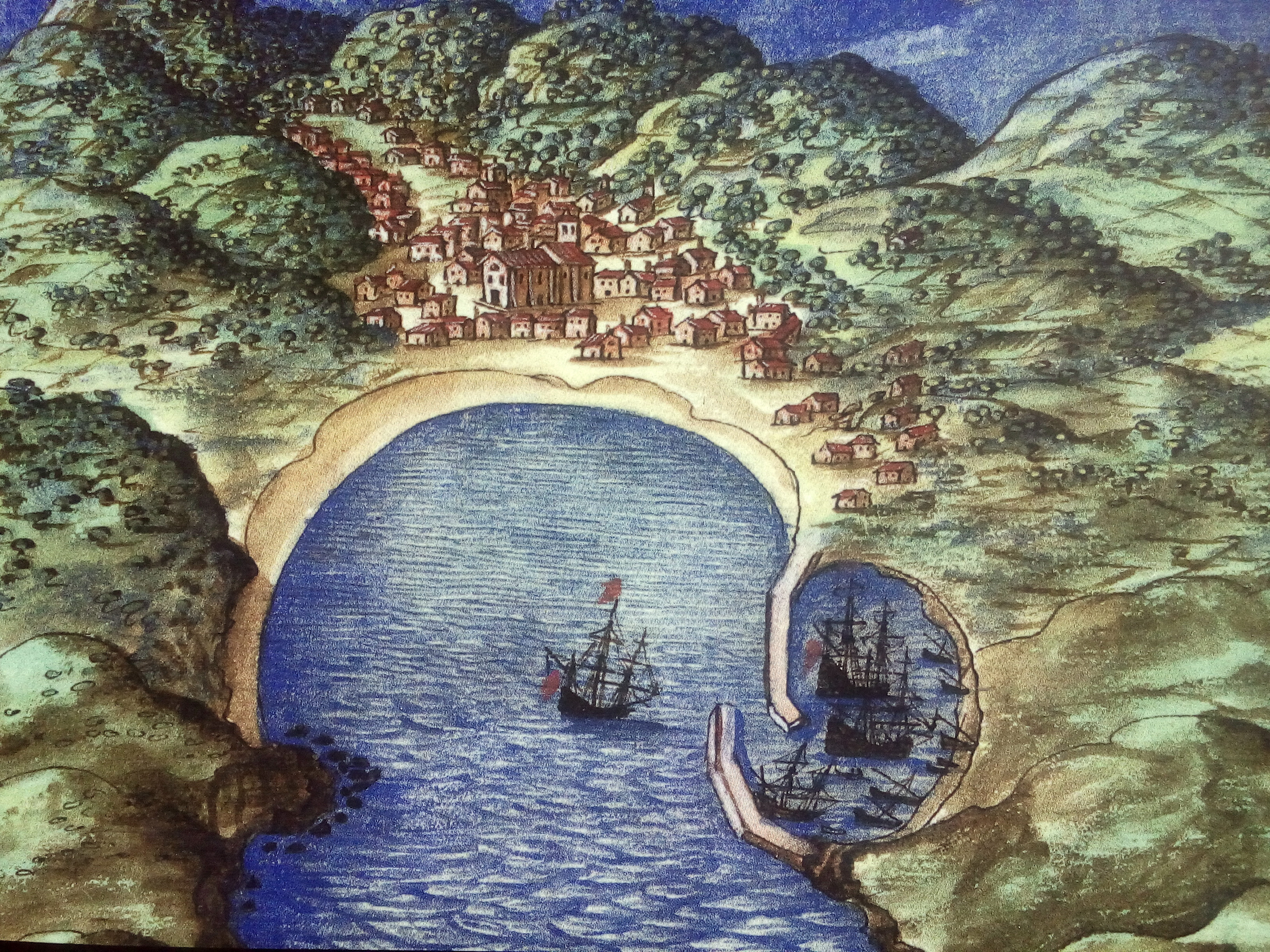
Engraving of Mutriku by Portuguese cartographer Pedro Texeira, 1634

The Jentiletxea II and Iruroin Langatxo caves reveal prehistoric occupation in periods dating back to the Upper Paleolithic.

The town of Mutriku was founded in 1209 by the Castilian King Alfonso VIII, who granted the town charter and gave the right to build a wall to protect the city (there are still some visible remnants of the wall).

The medieval town developed rapidly. Important palaces and tower houses belonging to aristocratic families and the commercial and military classes were constructed. Unfortunately, in 1553 a fire destroyed much of the town. Only some stone houses were saved, while all wooden ones were lost.

At the end of the 19th century, Evaristo de Churruca designed new docks for the port. The passage of time revealed problems with the original designs, and in the middle of the 20th century the docks were modified by Ramon Iribarren Cavanilles to correct wave problems. However, in the late 20th century decline of the fishing sector gave rise to increased attention to another alternative, tourism. To solve port entry and stability problems with the dock and attract tourists interested in ocean access to the Bay of Biscay, a new seawall was designed and located outside the old harbor. The new wave-powered power plant is located in the newest seawall.

With the 21st century came another important works project, the building of a direct route to the harbor to ameliorate heavy traffic in the medieval old city center. The roads to Deba and Ondarroa were also improved.

== Monuments ==
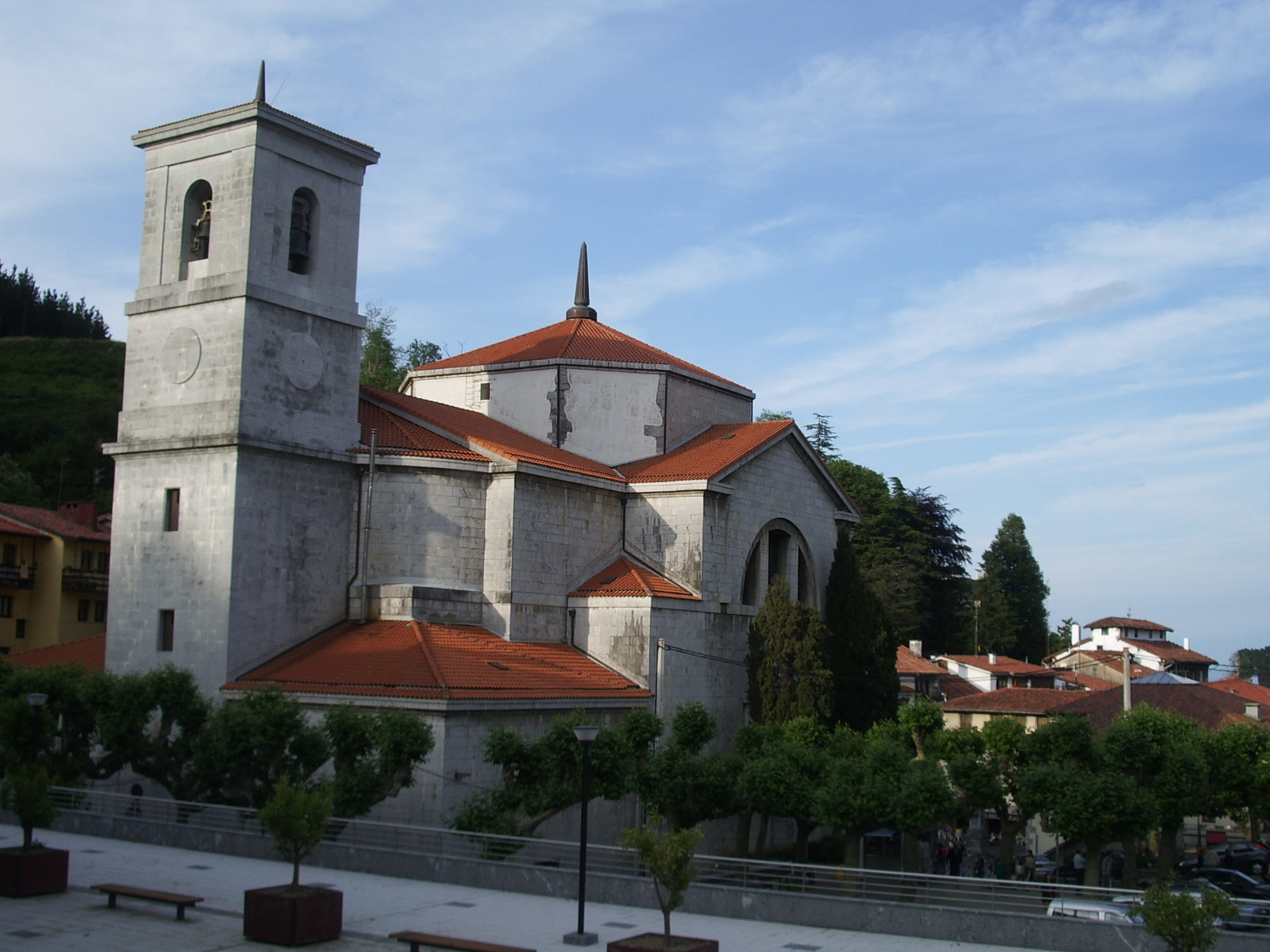
Nuestra Señora de la Asunción Church

- Iglesia de Nuestra Señora de la Asunción, a Neoclasical church with great stairway for access, inside it has a Christ made by El Greco.
- Palace Galdona, 'baroque façade with impressive coat of arms and a large overhang corner carving.
- House Churruca, commissioned by the General Gaztañeta in 1731.
- Zabiel Palace, 16th century. Impressive eave and coat of arms.
- Home of Churruca, 18th-century building with Churruca family coat of arms, here was born Cosme Damián Churruca.
- Lonja Zaharra, 18th-century building, former fish market. Today Navy's social home.
- Berriatúa Tower, Prior to 1553 with yellow sandstone. Impressive wood carving at doors and windows.
- Montalivet Palace, Build by the architect Ignacio Ibero in the 18th century.
- House Olazarra-Mizquia, With stone façade from the 17th century, it has a great coat of arms
- Church of San Andrés de Astigarribia, which has been considered one of the oldest in the province of Guipúzcoa for having pre romanic elements, like a horseshoe shape window arch. Subsequent studies have revealed that these elements are from the 11th century.

== Festivals ==
At Mutriku the following festivals are held:

- Berdel Eguna (day of mackerel), usually the first Saturday of April.
- Malen Jaiak (Festival Mary Magdalene), 21–25 July.
- Kalbaixoko Jaiak (Festival of Kalbario), 14–16 September.
- Gaba Beltza (Black night), the closest Saturday to October 31, and sometimes, the same day. It is a local version of the Halloween.

== Notable people ==
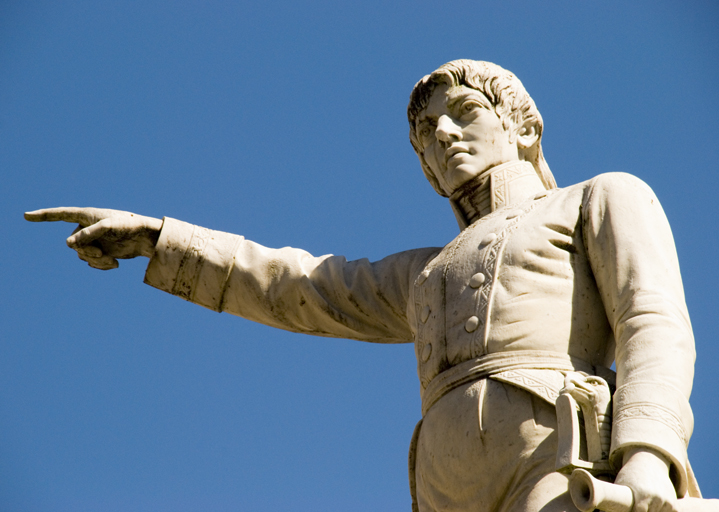
Statue of Cosme Damián de Churruca y Elorza in Mutriku

- Juan Gamboa (15th century): General.
- Juan Antón de Astigarribia (16th century): Trader.
- Domingo de Irure (16th century): admiral who fought Francis Drake at the Estrecho de Magallanes.
- Pascual de Iturriza (16th century): architect.
- Hernando de Lizaola (16th century): General.
- Pedro de Lizaola (16th century): Bishop Trípoli.
- Domingo de Dornutegui (17th century): Admiral.
- Rodrigo de Guilistegui (17th century): Admiral.
- Juan de Iturriza (17th century): Admiral.
- Miguel Vidazábal (17th century): Admiral.
- José Antonio de Gaztañeta (1656-1728): Admiral and naval architect.
- Cosme Damián de Churruca y Elorza (1761-1805): Scientist and brigadier of the Navy. Hero of Battle of Trafalgar.
- Julián de Churruca: Lawyer, philologist and hero of the War of Spanish Independence.
- Juan Bautista Acillona (1832-): Liberal politician.
- José de Churruca (1791-1849): Judge and Politician.
- Evaristo de Churruca (1841-1917): engineer. First count of Mutriku.
- Juan Pesón, Juan de Landa (1894-1968): Actor.
- Mateo de la Osa (1905-1995): Boxer.
- José María Pagoaga (1952-1995): Handball player.
- José Antonio Arcocha Martija (1911-1996): Basque writer.
- Sabino Andonegui (1931): football player and coach.
- Francisco Churruca (1936): Pelotari.
- Dionisio Urreisti (1942): football player.
- Guillermo Andonegi (1949): sculptor.
- Xiri Andonegi (1955- 2011): sculptor.
- Imanol Andonegi (1958): sculptor.
- Juan Carlos Pérez Gómez (1958): musician and member of Itoiz.
- Luciano Iturrino (1963): football player.
- Peio Arreitunandia (1974–2025): professional cyclist.
- Estitxu Arozena (1975): Bertsolari.
- Asier Illarramendi (1990): former Real Madrid and Real Sociedad footballer, currently playing for Kitchee Sports Club

== See also ==
- Debabarrena
- Mutriku Breakwater Wave Plant

== Sources ==
- Ministerio del interior (ed.): «Reultados elecciones municipales Motrico 2011». Consultado el 19 de junio de 2011.
