= Elgeta =

Place in Gipuzkoa, Basque Country, Spain

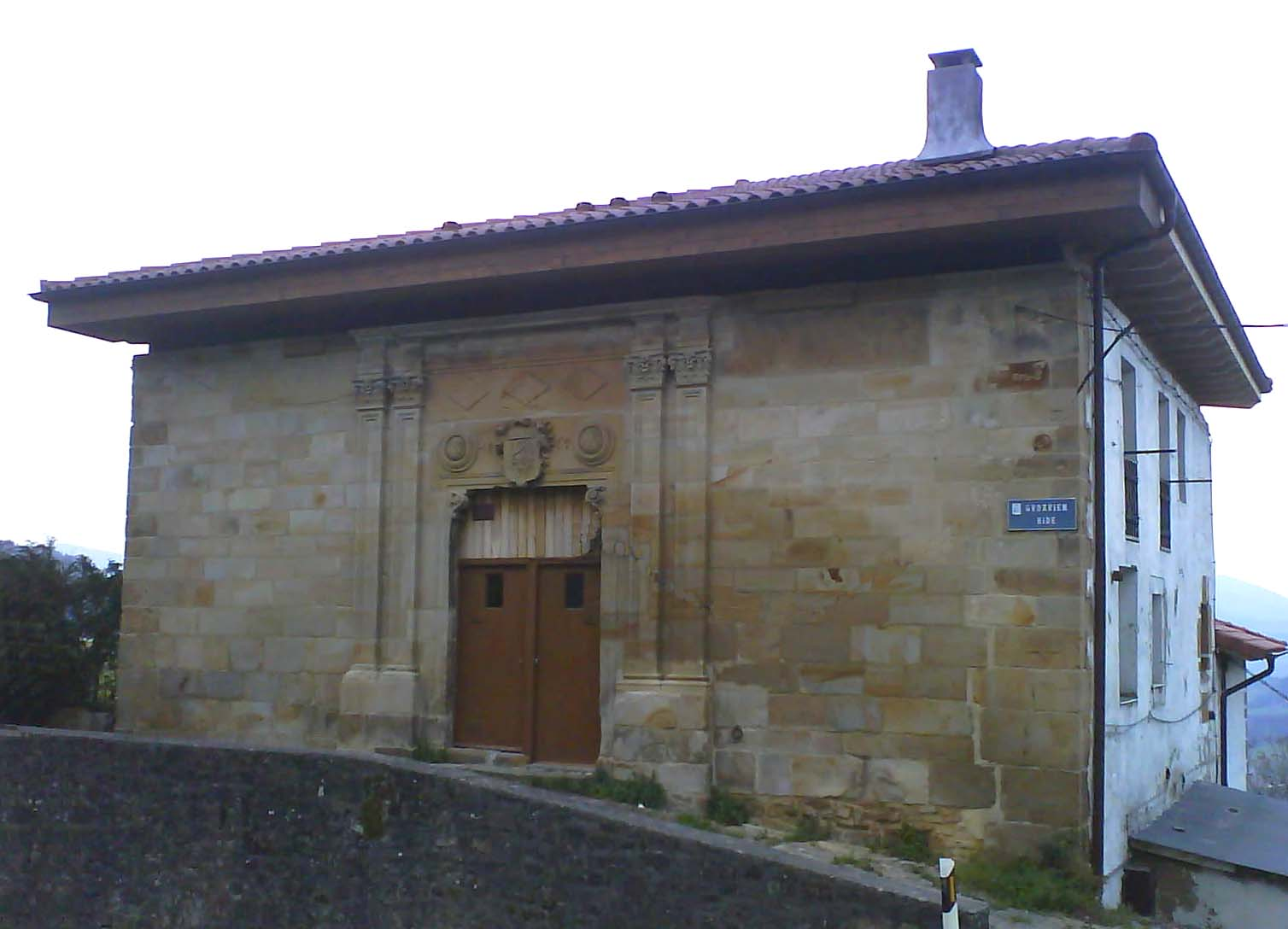

- Coat of arms

- Location of Elgeta within the Basque Country Location of Elgeta within Spain
- Coordinates: 43°10′40″N 2°27′10″W
- Country: Spain
- Autonomous community: Basque Country
- Province: Gipuzkoa
- Comarca: Debagoiena

Government
  - Mayor: Iraitz Lazkano

Area
  - Total: 16.83 km^{2} (6.50 sq mi)
- Elevation: 462 m (1,516 ft)

Population (2025-01-01)
  - Total: 1,133
  - Density: 67.32/km^{2} (174.4/sq mi)
- Time zone: UTC+1 (CET)
  - Summer (DST): UTC+2 (CEST)
- Website: www.elgeta.eus

Elgeta (Spanish: Elgueta) is a town located in the province of Gipuzkoa, in the autonomous community of Basque Country, northern Spain.
