= Debabarrena =

Region of the Basque Country, Spain

Coordinates: 43.2376°N 2.4034°W

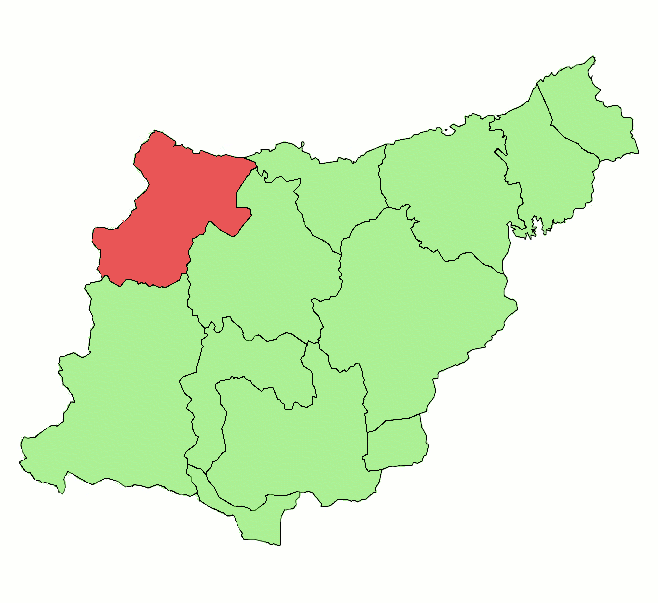
Map of Debabarrena within Gipuzkoa.

Debabarrena (English: Lower Deba) is an eskualdea / comarca located in Gipuzkoa, Basque Country (Spain). It has an area of 180,3 km^{2}. It is north from the comarca of Debagoiena, east from the province of Biscay, and south from the Gulf of Biscay.

The municipalities which compose Debabarrena are Eibar, Soraluze-Placencia de las Armas, Elgoibar, Mendaro, Deba, Mutriku (in Gipuzkoa) and Ermua and Mallabia (in Biscay). Eibar is the biggest one with about 28,000 inhabitants. The second biggest one is Elgoibar, with about 11,000 inhabitants, and the other municipalities have less than 10,000 citizens.

== Natural environment ==
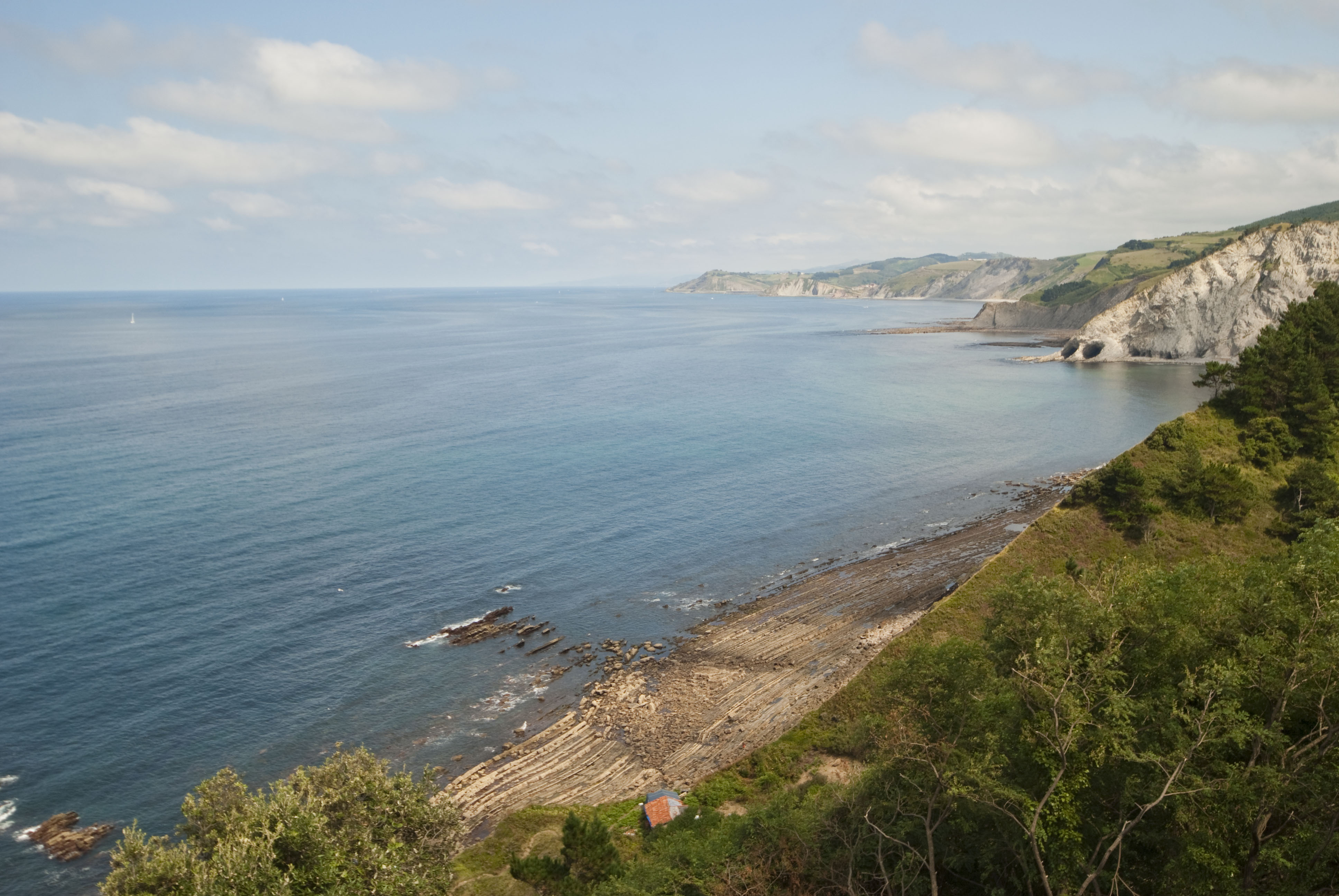
Coast of Deba

Debabarrena is surrounded by many mountains, which are not very high. The higher ones have a height of around 800 metres. Urko (791 metres), Arno (612 metres) and Andutz (610 metres) are the highest ones. All the region is full of forests and prairies, and also has many streams, most of them tributaries of the Deba river, which names the comarca. These streams are usually short and have a high level of contamination, despite the fact that the level of contamination has been reduced considerably since the 1980s.

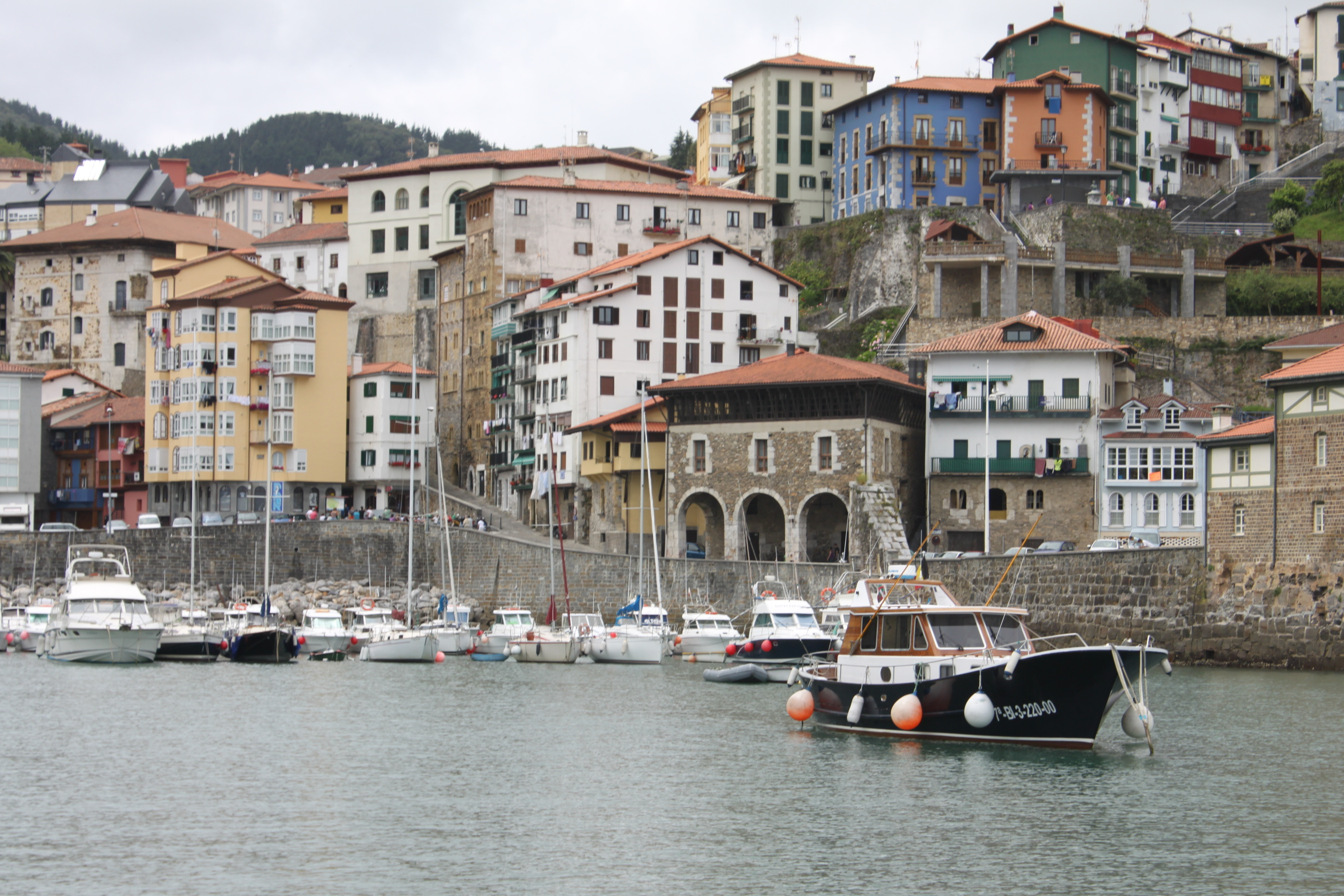
Mutriku's harbour view

== Communication ==
Debabarrena is located in the centre of the Basque Country, which benefits the region's communications. The main highway is the AP-8, which connects Debabarrena with Bilbao and the French border, but also the AP-1, which connects Eibar with Debagoiena and Araba/Álava.

The railway line that communicates Bilbao and Donostia-San Sebastian is also used in Deba, Mendaro, Elgoibar and Eibar mainly as a short-distance train. The harbours of Deba and Mutriku are not used for goods and passengers.

== Population ==
The total population of Debabarrena is about 72,000 people. The city with most citizens is Eibar, with nearly 28,000 inhabitants. Elgoibar is the second biggest one with 10,000, and the other small towns with less than 5,000. There is also a notable rural population in the baserri (Basque) or caseríos (Spanish), the farmhouses that are typical of the Basque Country.

The region had around 100,000 inhabitants in the 1950s and 1960s because of the big industrial development and the resulting immigration. But, the industrial crisis of the 1970s and 1980s made the population decrease.

== Economy ==
The economy of the region is highly industrial, but the primary sector is also notable. In the primary sector, there is a big number of small exploitation lands, around 1,000, most of them for sheep and bovinae livestock. Fishing is only significant in Mutriku.

Industry is the primary activity in the region, and more than half of the population works in that area. The industrialization was very important until the mid-20th century, when sewing machines and bicycles were produced, but since then the metal industry has had a very big importance, together with the automotive industry.

The service sector also has a lot of activity, with the 40% of population working on it. It is very remarkable in Eibar, and tourism in Mutriku and Deba.
