= Leintz Gatzaga =

- Municipality
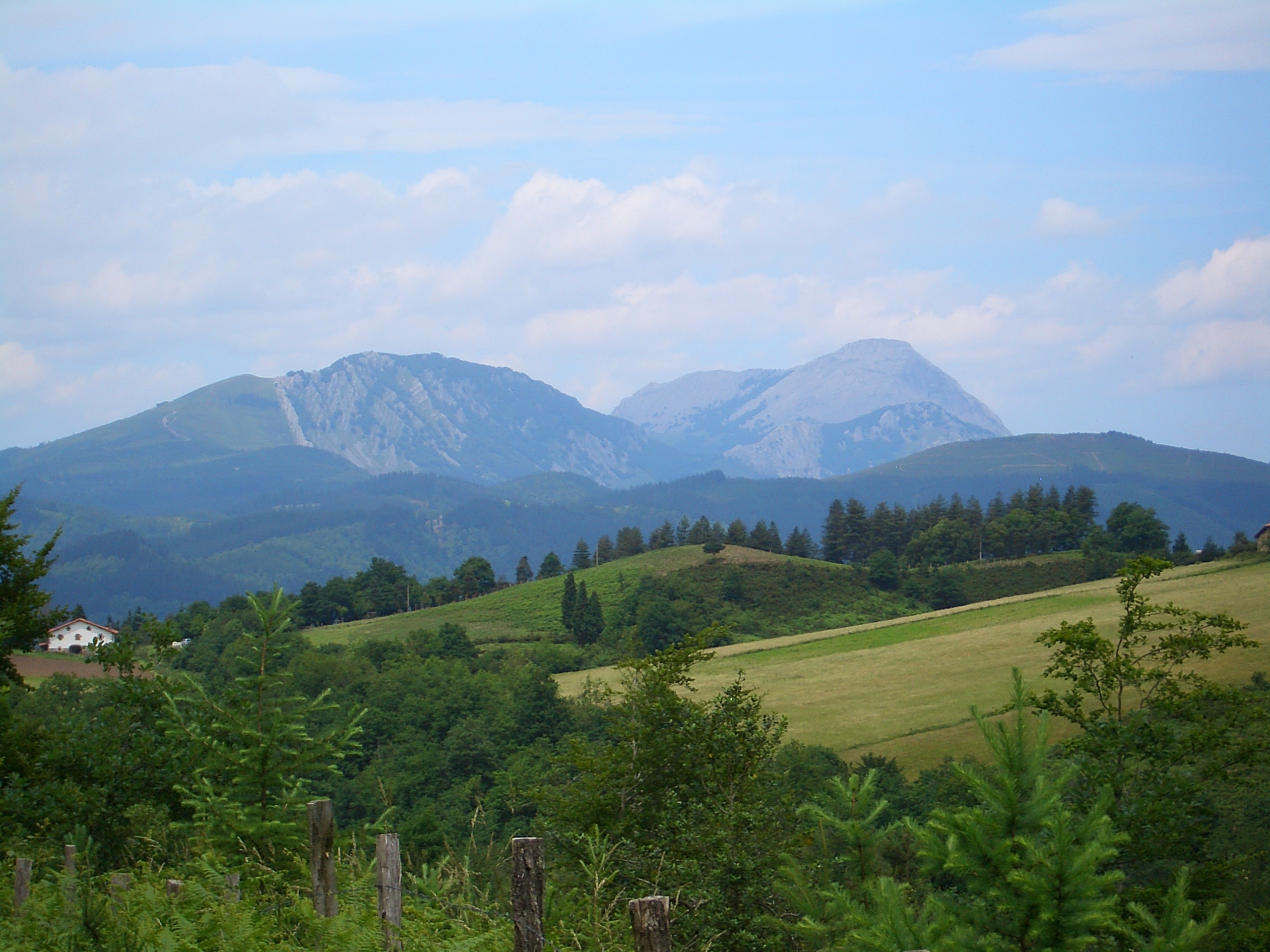
- In the hills south of Leintz Gatzaga

- Coat of arms

- Location of Leintz Gatzaga within the Basque Country
- Coordinates: 42°59′N 02°34′W
- Country: Spain
- Autonomous community: Basque Country
- Province: Gipuzkoa
- Eskualdea: Debagoiena
- Founded: 1331

Government
  - Mayor: Eneka Zancada Rementeria

Area
  - Total: 14.72 km^{2} (5.68 sq mi)
- Elevation: 455 m (1,493 ft)

Population (2025-01-01)
  - Total: 205
  - Density: 13.9/km^{2} (36.1/sq mi)
- Time zone: UTC+1 (CET)
  - Summer (DST): UTC+2 (CEST)
- Website: Official website

Leintz Gatzaga (Spanish, Salinas de Léniz) is a town located in the province of Gipuzkoa, in the Autonomous Community of Basque Country, northern Spain. The municipality's population is 251 (2015).

== Etymology ==
The first part of the name, Leintz, comes from the name of the valley, the village being located in the Valley of Leintz.

The second part is linked to the salt mine (gatzaga in Basque) located in the village, part of the reason for the village's existence. Salt is no longer produced but used to be a mainstay of the village's economy.

== Geography ==
Leintz-Gatzaga covers 14.7 km² and is located in the province of Gipuzkoa, very close to Álava. It is situated in a mountainous area with steep hillsides, wooded and with almost no flat agricultural land. It is in the region of Alto Deva where the source of the river Deba is located.

Leintz-Gatzaga has a small old part that consisting of four streets, formerly walled. Most of the residents live in this part, the rest spread over some 35 Basque farmhouses around the village.

== History ==
The history of this village is linked to two factors: the salt mines and the road.

=== Salt mining ===
Salt mines have operated in the area since the Iron Ages, leading to the foundation of the village. Before the village was formed, there were some farmhouses and small towns that were protected by the Castle of Aitzorrotz. Although the salt mines were owned by the royalty, the residents of the village had some privileges to develop trade and exploit the salt.

The salt mines were of major economic importance and led to some disputes. For example, in 1374 the Count of Oñati appropriated the village and Leintz Gatzaga has been burnt down several times, in 1334, 1371, 1492 and 1498. Following the last burning, it was ordered that the old part must be built of stone.

Whereas in most places the vaporization system was used in salt mining, in Leintz Gatzaga, due to its cold and wet climate, salt miners would use fire to evaporate the water. The machinery used changed throughout the centuries. Until the 19th century the work was done without machinery, but when a company called Productos Leniz bought the salt mine, new machinery was introduced in 1920 and production increased. However, the quality of the salt was not as high as that of sea salt and after 1500 years, in 1972, the salt mine was closed.

In the 17th century the Royal Road was built. This road joins the coast of Gipuzkoa with the interior. So this village became part of the route that joined Castilla with Europa. For this reason, the economy of the village grew, but this prosperity was affected by wars, such as the War of Spanish Independence, the War of the Pyrenees or the Carlist Wars.

The decline of the village began in the middle of the 19th century. On the one hand, the opening of a new road between Idiazabal and Altsasu in 1851 reduced the importance of the Royal Road. And on the other hand was the construction of the rail line between Madrid and Irun. These two facts marginalized the village and reduced its importance gradually. Apart from that, the salt mines also grew less profitable and were closed. These factors combined plunged the village into a serious economic and demographic downturn.

== Economy ==
Although the municipality has an important rural stamp, almost half of the population works in the industrial sector of surrounding municipalities. Very few people are dedicated exclusively to agricultural and livestock tasks.

Salinas de Leniz tries to promote tourism with a tourism office, 5 restaurants and several rural guesthouses.

== Demography ==
As of 2015 the population was 251 and while the village has never been very large, in 1950 the population shrank because Leintz Gatzaga was the only village of the region which did not take part in industrialization. The population is ageing, although immigration has altered the demographics somewhat.

== Monuments ==
Despite being a small town, Salinas de Leniz has an architectural heritage. It is still possible to glimpse the old medieval urban layout, which originated from the reconstruction of the town after the fire of 1371.

Although the ramparts disappeared, it is still possible to see the five door entrances as well as numerous palatial houses of interest with their shields and coats of arms on the facades.

There are several religious monuments as Dorleta sanctuary, located outside the village next to the salt mine, The Church of San Millan, built in the fourteenth century and reconstructed in the sixteenth. Civil monuments are numerous as well in the old town of Salinas de Leniz: Torrekua, Elexalde, Olaso, Indianokua, Soran and Garro palaces are some of the most important

== Culture ==
There is a Salt Museum, which shows how the salt extraction process was performed in the old salt mine and the importance in the local economy. The salt facilities have been renovated and equipped as a museum.
