= Mendaro, Spain =

Mendaro
- Municipality
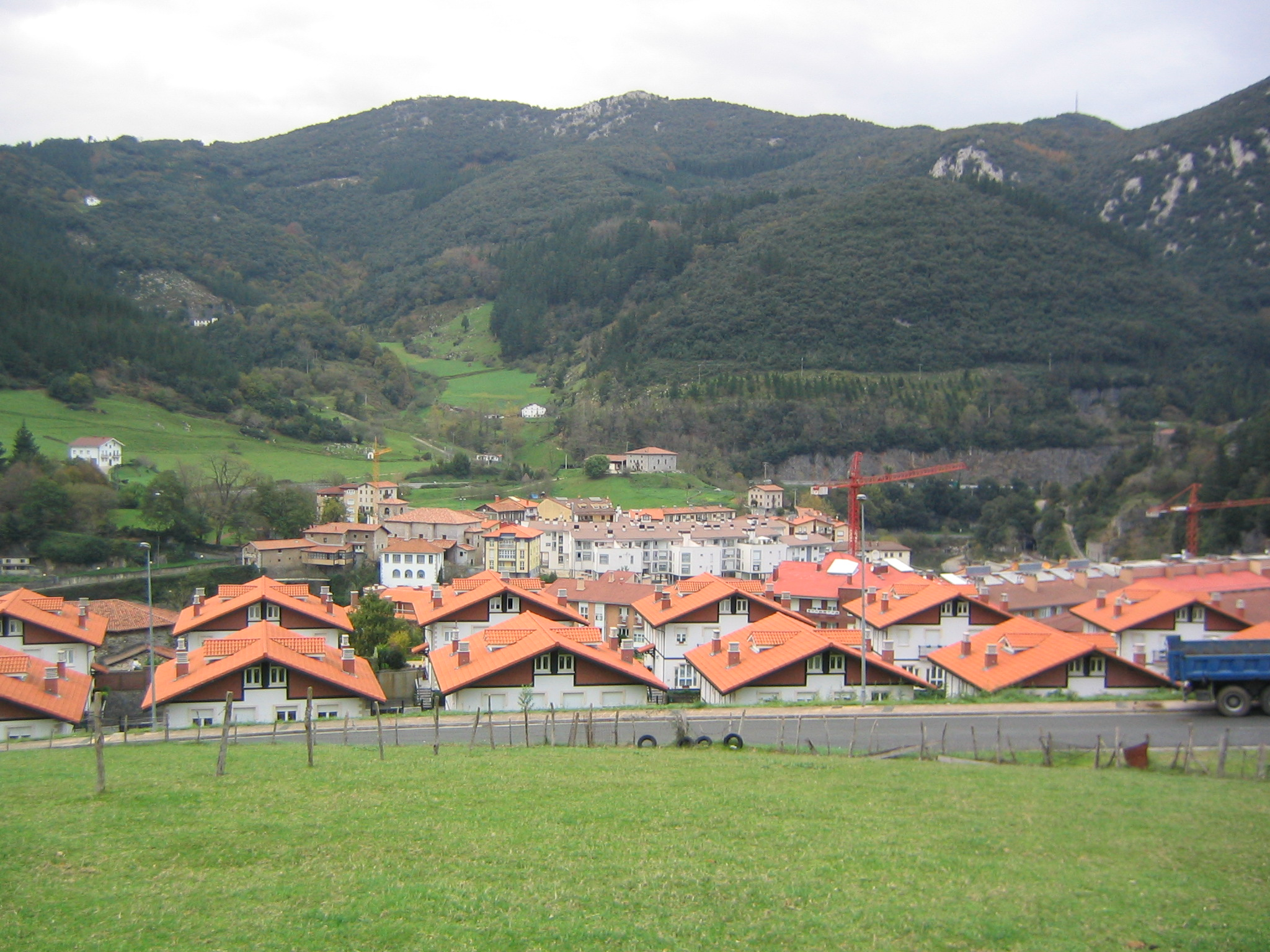

- Coat of arms

- Location of Mendaro within the Basque Country
- Coordinates: 43°15.85′N 2°22.53′W
- Country: Spain
- Autonomous community: Basque Country
- Province: Gipuzkoa
- Eskualdea: Debabarrena
- Founded: 1983

Government
  - Mayor: Sonia Garcia Raposo

Area
  - Total: 25.39 km^{2} (9.80 sq mi)
- Elevation: 30 m (98 ft)

Population (2025-01-01)
  - Total: 2,028
  - Density: 79.87/km^{2} (206.9/sq mi)
- Time zone: UTC+1 (CET)
  - Summer (DST): UTC+2 (CEST)
- Postal code: 20850

Mendaro is a town and municipality located in the province of Gipuzkoa, in the Autonomous Community of Basque Country, northern Spain.

The Mendaro Valley is the town's namesake. There is little agreement on the origin or meaning of the word itself. Surrounded by mountains, the town is located in northeast Gipuzkoa near the Biscayan border.

Officially founded in 1983, Mendaro is considered one of Gipuzkoa's youngest municipalities.
