= Aretxabaleta =

- Municipality
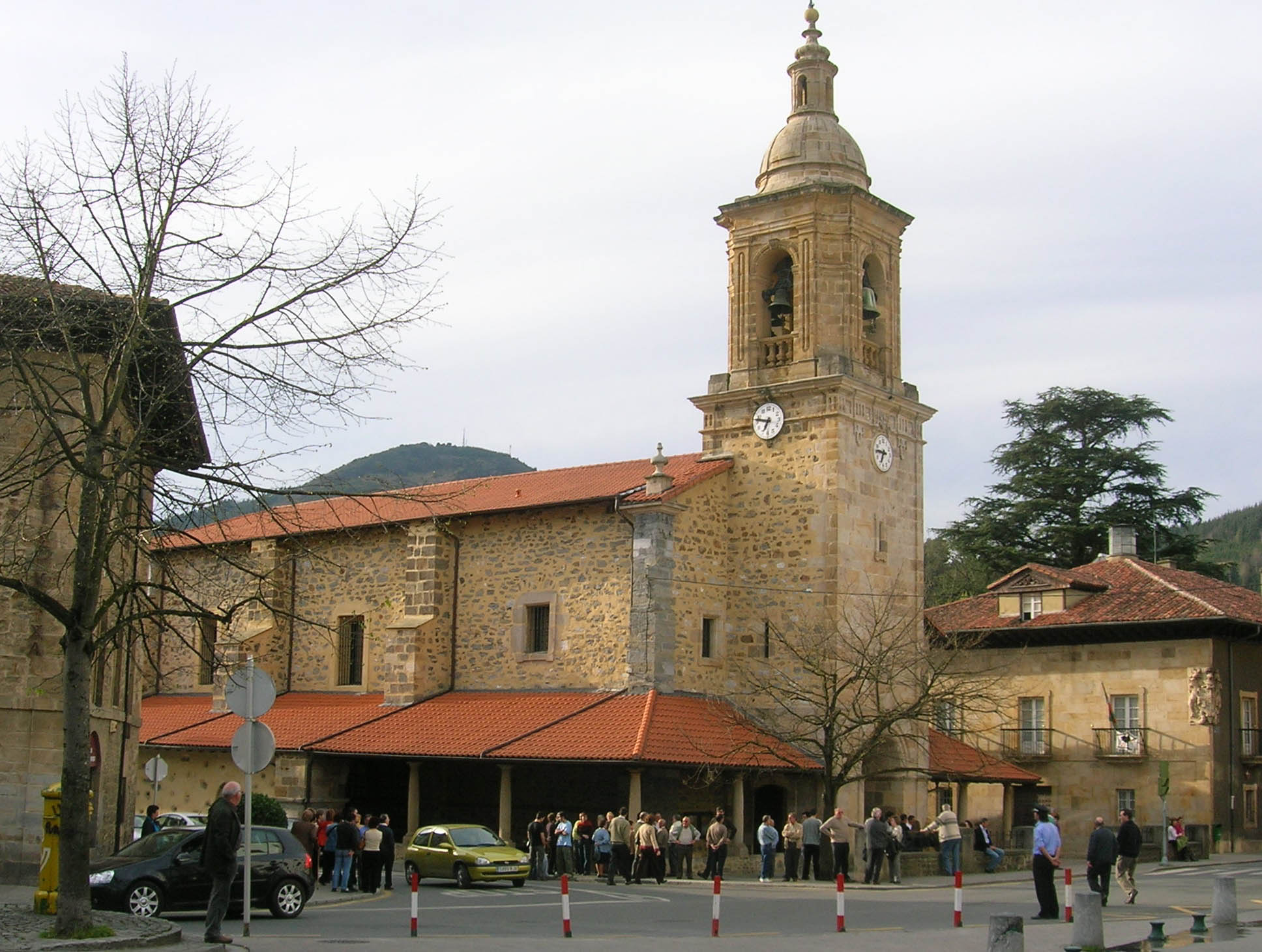

- Coat of arms

- Location in Spain
- Coordinates: 43°2′10″N 2°30′16″W
- Country: Spain
- Autonomous community: Basque Country
- Province: Gipuzkoa
- Comarca: Debagoiena

Area
  - Total: 29.13 km^{2} (11.25 sq mi)
- Elevation: 260 m (850 ft)

Population (2025-01-01)
  - Total: 7,178
  - Density: 246.4/km^{2} (638.2/sq mi)
- Time zone: UTC+1 (CET)
  - Summer (DST): UTC+2 (CEST)
- Postal code: 20550
- Dialing code: 34 (Spain) + 943 (Gipuzkoa)
- Website: Official website

Aretxabaleta is a town in the province of Gipuzkoa, in the Autonomous Community of Basque Country, northern Spain.

It is located on the Bergara road, almost adjacent to its larger northern neighbor, the city of Arrasate, and the smaller Eskoriatza to the south.

== The place name ==
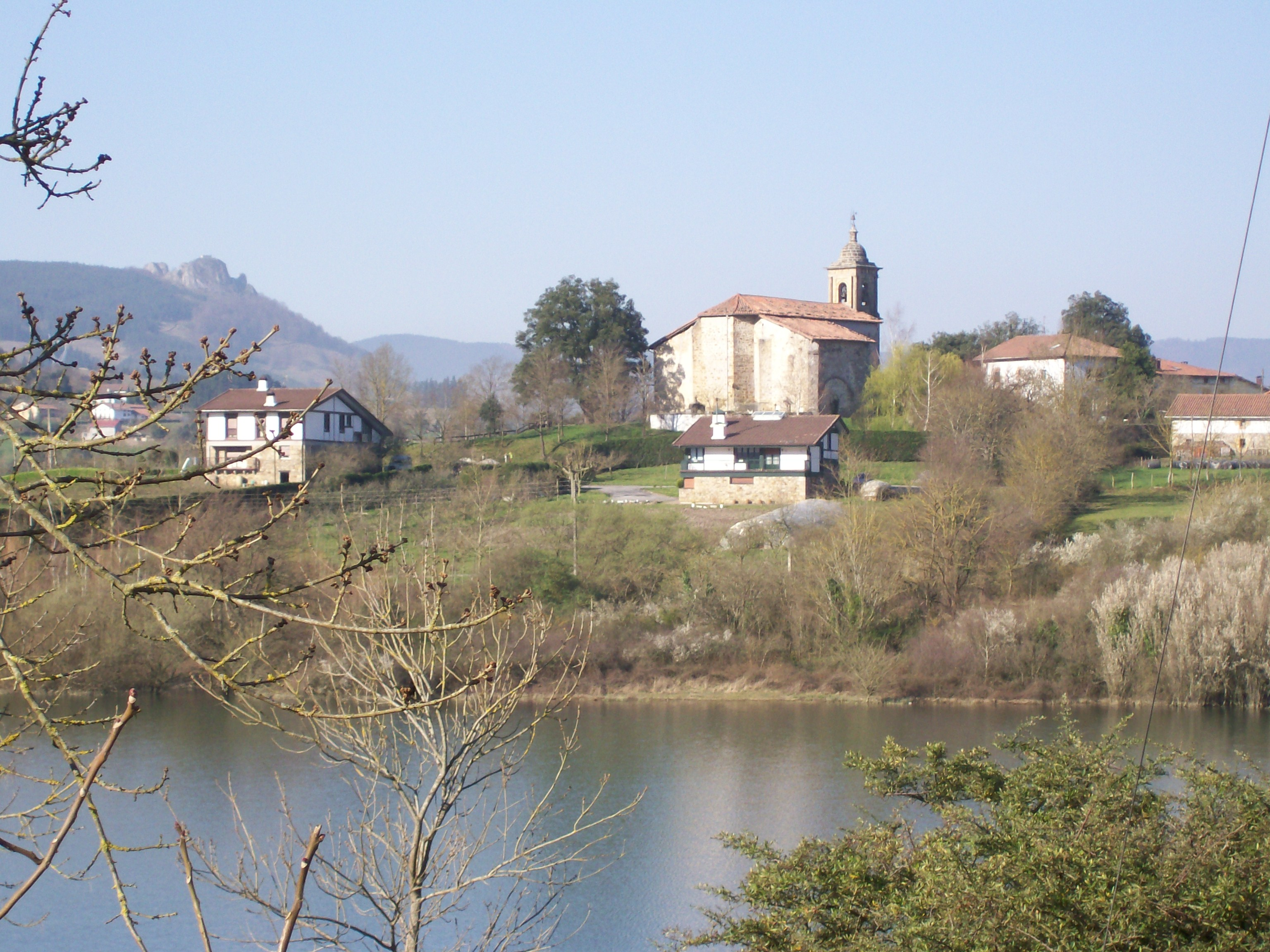
Aozaratza quarter

In the past, the Basque name "Aretxabaleta" was commonly used, both in Spanish and in English with the Spanish spelling, Arechavaleta. The local government (udala) decided to officially change the spelling to the Basque "Aretxabaleta" on June 4, 1979. Their decision was authorized by Spanish central government on March 3, 1981.
