= Debagoiena =

District of Gipuzkoa, Basque Country, Spain

Coordinates: 43.0666°N 2.4687°W

- Eskualdea / Comarca
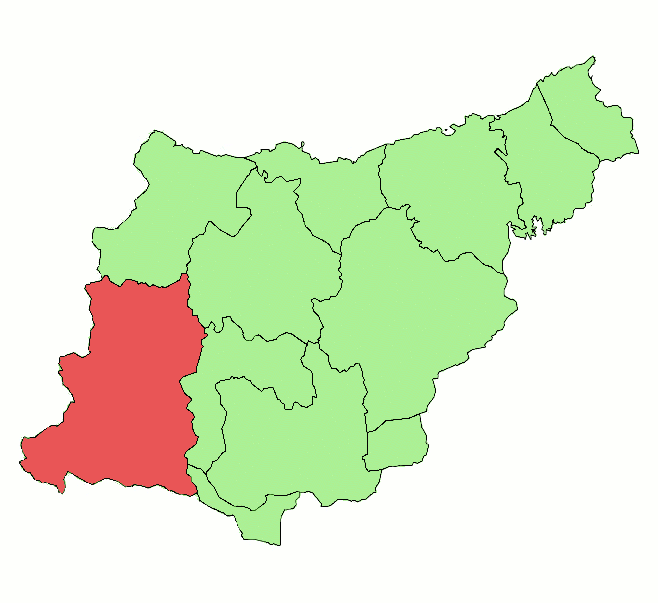
- Country: Spain
- Autonomous community: Basque Country
- Province: Gipuzkoa
- Main admin. HQ: Arrasate

Population (2024)
  - Total: 62,975
- Time zone: UTC+1 (CET)
  - Summer (DST): UTC+2 (CEST)

Debagoiena (in Basque; in Spanish: Alto Deva) is one of the seven eskualdeak of Gipuzkoa, Spain. There are eight municipalities in Debagoiena, the biggest of which being Arrasate/Mondragón.

== Communities ==
Overview of townships
Municipality	Population
Arrasate/Mondragón	22,003
Bergara	14,649
Oñati	10,940
Aretxabaleta	6,698
Eskoriatza	4,051
Antzuola	2,161
Elgeta	1,078
Leintz Gatzaga	262
