= Deba River =

River in Spain

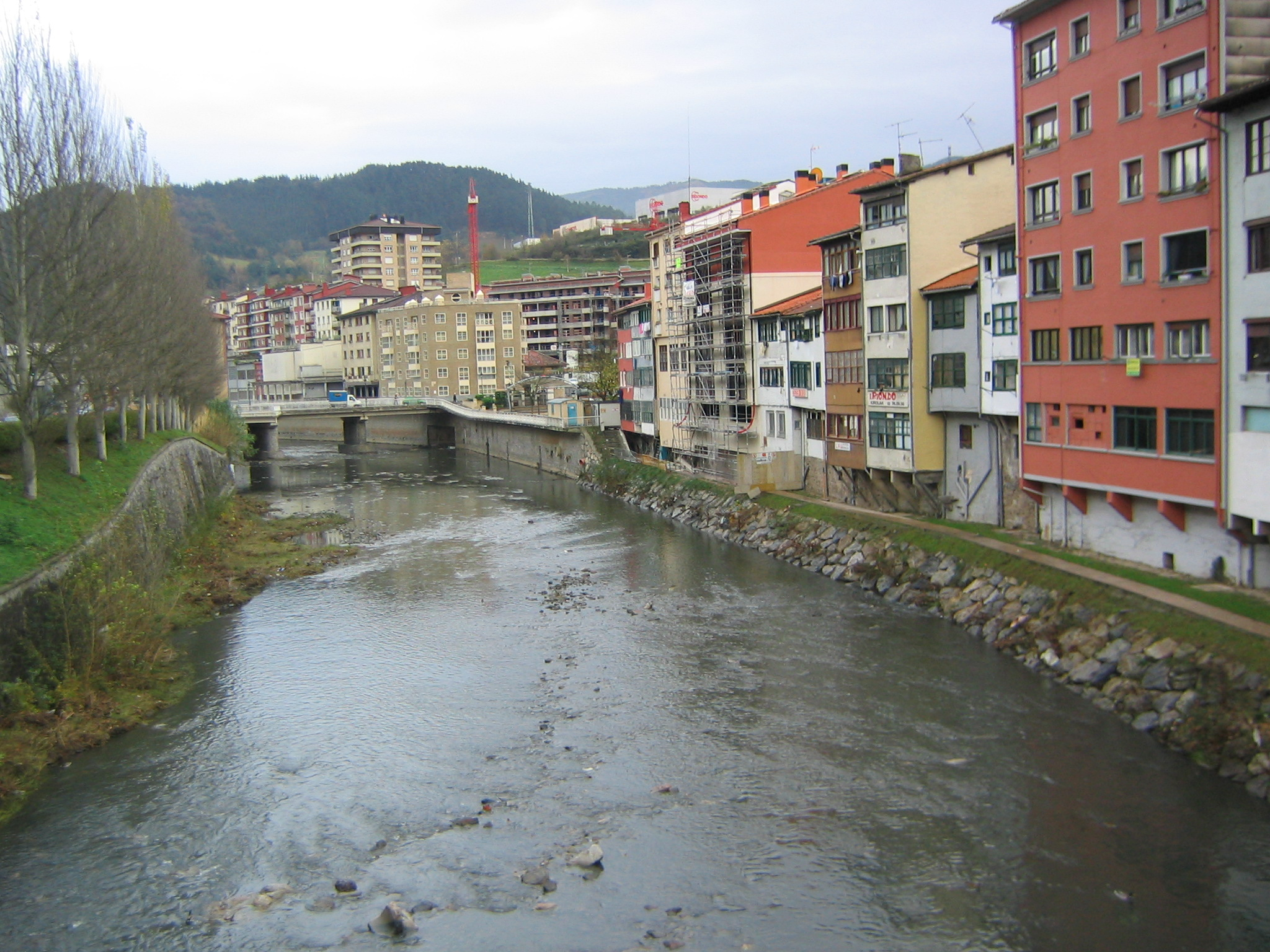
- The Deba River as seen from Elgoibar

Location
- Country: Spain
- State: Basque Country

Physical characteristics
- Mouth
  - coordinates: 43°17′59″N 2°21′19″W
- Length: 58 km (36 mi)
- Discharge
  - average: 13.4 m^{3}/s (470 cu ft/s)

Basin features
- Tributaries
  - left: Angiozar River, Aramaio River, Aranerreka River, Kilimon River, Ego River
  - right: Oñate River

The Deba River (Basque: Deba ibaia; Spanish: río Deva) is a river in the Basque Country, Spain. It rises in Arlaban, into Araba province lands, and flows into the Atlantic Ocean, in the Bay of Biscay, in Deba, Gipuzkoa.
