= Tolosaldea =

Coordinates: 43°07′59″N 2°04′27″W

- Eskualdea / Comarca
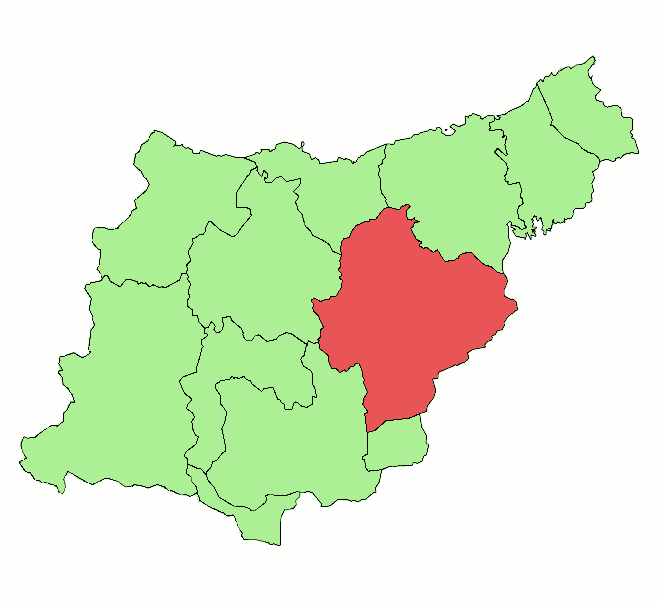
- Country: Spain
- Autonomous community: Basque Country
- Province: Gipuzkoa
- Main admin. HQ: Tolosa
- Municipalities: List: Abaltzisketa, Aduna, Albiztur, Alegia, Alkiza, Altzo, Amezketa, Anoeta, Asteasu, Baliarrain, Belauntza, Berastegi, Berrobi, Bidania-Goiatz, Elduain, Gaztelu, Hernialde, Ibarra, Ikaztegieta, Irura, Larraul, Leaburu, Lizartza, Orendain, Orexa, Tolosa, Villabona, Zizurkil

Area
  - Total: 331.4 km^{2} (128.0 sq mi)

Population
  - Total: 45,495
  - Density: 137.3/km^{2} (355.6/sq mi)
- Time zone: UTC+1 (CET)
  - Summer (DST): UTC+2 (CEST)

Tolosaldea is one of the eight comarcas in Gipuzkoa, formed by 28 municipalities. Tolosa is the main town. An estimated 47,880 people live in the area in 2018.

== Municipalities ==
Basque Name (Official)	Historical Spanish Name	Population 2001 Census	2011 Census	2018 Estimate
Abaltzisketa	Abalcisqueta	277	320	320
Aduna		333	451	469
Albiztur	Albístur	287	313	309
Alegia	Alegría de Oria	1,583	1,763	1.726
Alkiza	Alquiza	264	365	374
Altzo	Alzo	326	407	427
Amezketa	Amézqueta	980	969	939
Anoeta		1,709	1,836	2,034
Asteasu		1,290	1,500	1,533
Baliarrain		97	125	137
Belauntza	Belaunza	285	287	239
Berastegi	Berástegui	973	1,057	1,081
Berrobi		566	568	602
Bidania-Goiatz	Bidegoyan	427	536	508
Elduain	Elduayen	210	232	239
Gaztelu		152	163	153
Hernialde		286	359	313
Ibarra		4,208	4,273	4,172
Ikaztegieta	Icazteguieta	377	469	488
Irura		910	1,626	1,862
Larraul		145	237	253
Leaburu		367	388	377
Lizartza	Lizarza	581	648	602
Orendain	Orendáin	143	180	218
Orexa	Oreja	83	123	123
Tolosa		17,642	18,389	19,525
Villabona		5,672	5,858	5,881
Zizurkil	Cizúrquil	2,820	2,854	2,976
