= Tony D. Pájaro =

Filipino painter (born 1948)

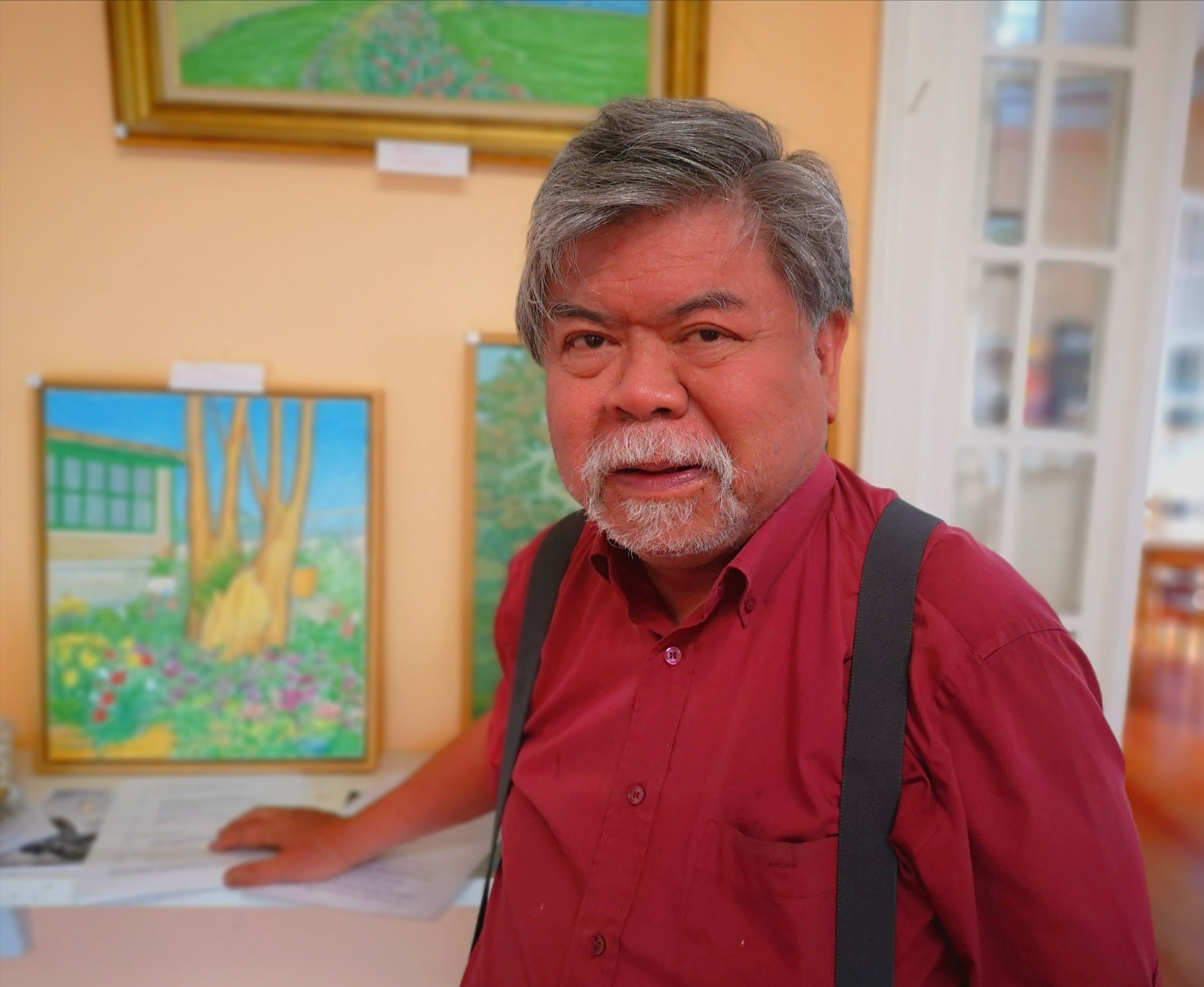
- Pájaro in 2021
- Born: Antonio Diestro Pájaro; December 1948 (age 77); Manila, Philippines
- Occupation: Painting

Antonio "Tony" Diestro Pájaro (born December 1948) is a Filipino painter. Born in Manila, he studied Fine Arts and then took complementary courses at the University of the Philippines (1970), at the University of Bilbao (1972, 1981), ar the University of the Basque Country (1983), and also researched the art and culture of the Philippine tribes Ifugao, Hanunoo, Blaan and T'Boli (1988).

The UNESCO awarded him an honorary diploma in painting in 1975.

== Biography ==
Born in Manila, he is the son of Victor Pájaro and Claudia Diestro. He began his artistic career in the Philippines, but later went on to study in Japan and in Europe. In 1971 he held complementary courses at the Philippine Art Educators Association in Manila. Later in 1981 he studied Child Art at the University of Bilbao and at the University of the Basque Country / Euskal Herriko Unibertsitatea.

He taught art in Manila (1970-1975), in Tokyo (1975-1976), and in San Sebastián (1976-2000, 2005). Since then he was the director of the children's workshop "Art Club" in San Sebastián. In 2006 he was one of the people who vindicated the cultural value of the Soroborda and Buskando water tanks built in the 19th century in San Sebastián when a real estate operation threatened to demolish them.

He was a contributor to the Philippine Graphic Magazine and the Philippine Daily Inquirer (1997-2002). In 2020 he took part in the Art Collector's Guide association in the Philippines.

In 1995 he was responsible for the summer course "Plastic Expression" organised by SOS Balkanes Gipuzkoa in refugee camps in Croatia, and Bosnia and Herzegovina.

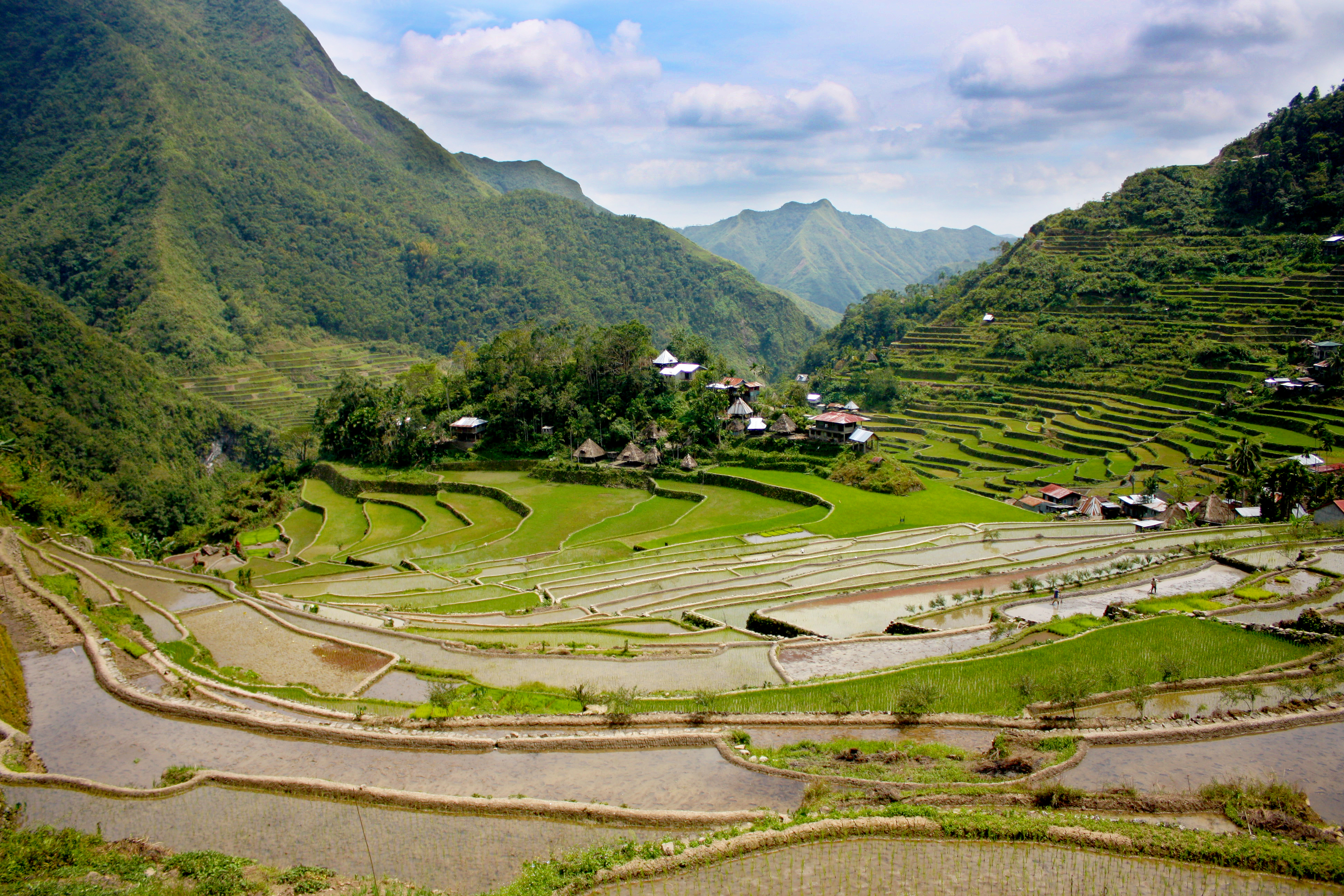
He researched on the art and culture of Ifugao.

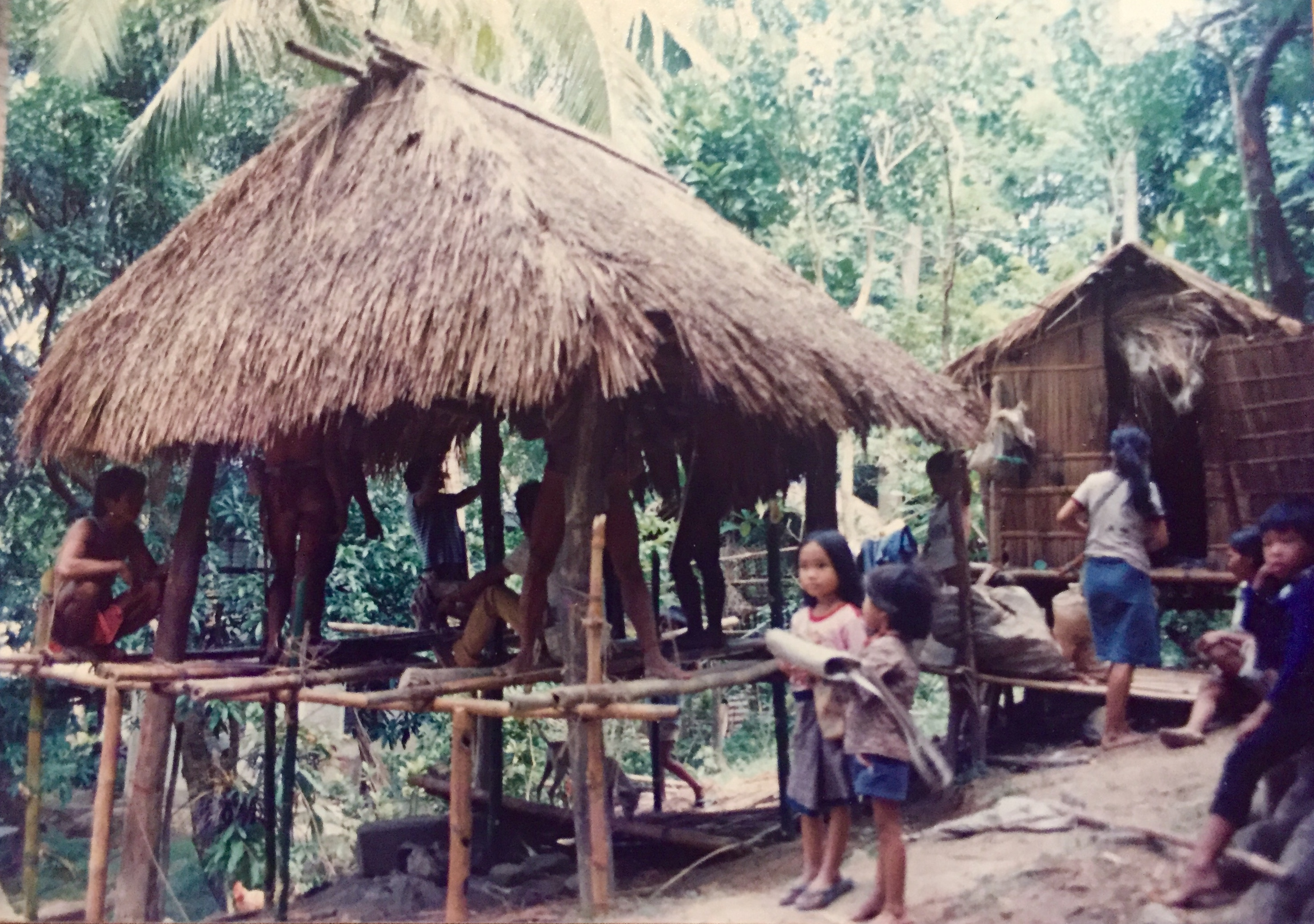
Ifugao, 1988

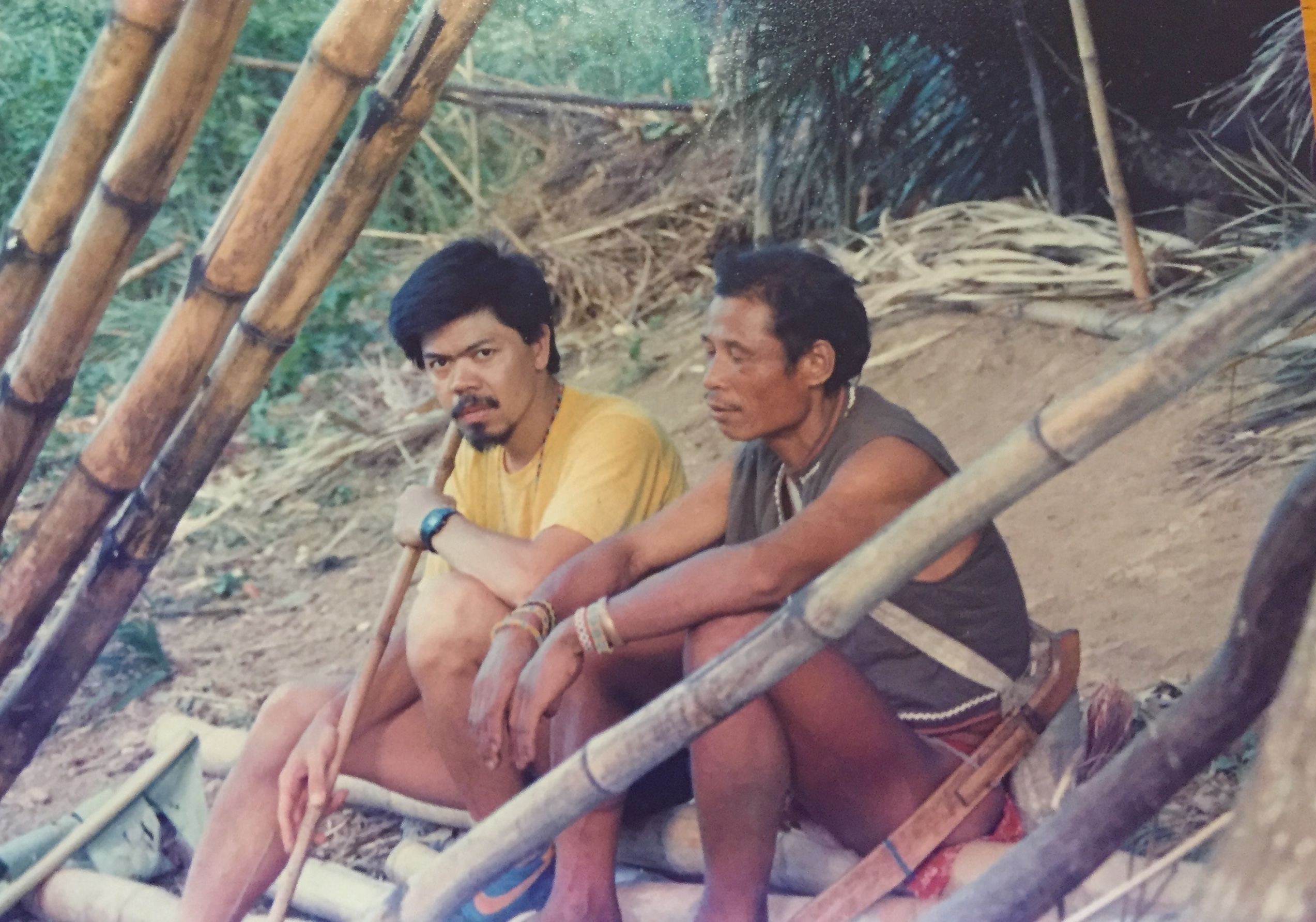
Mangyan 1988

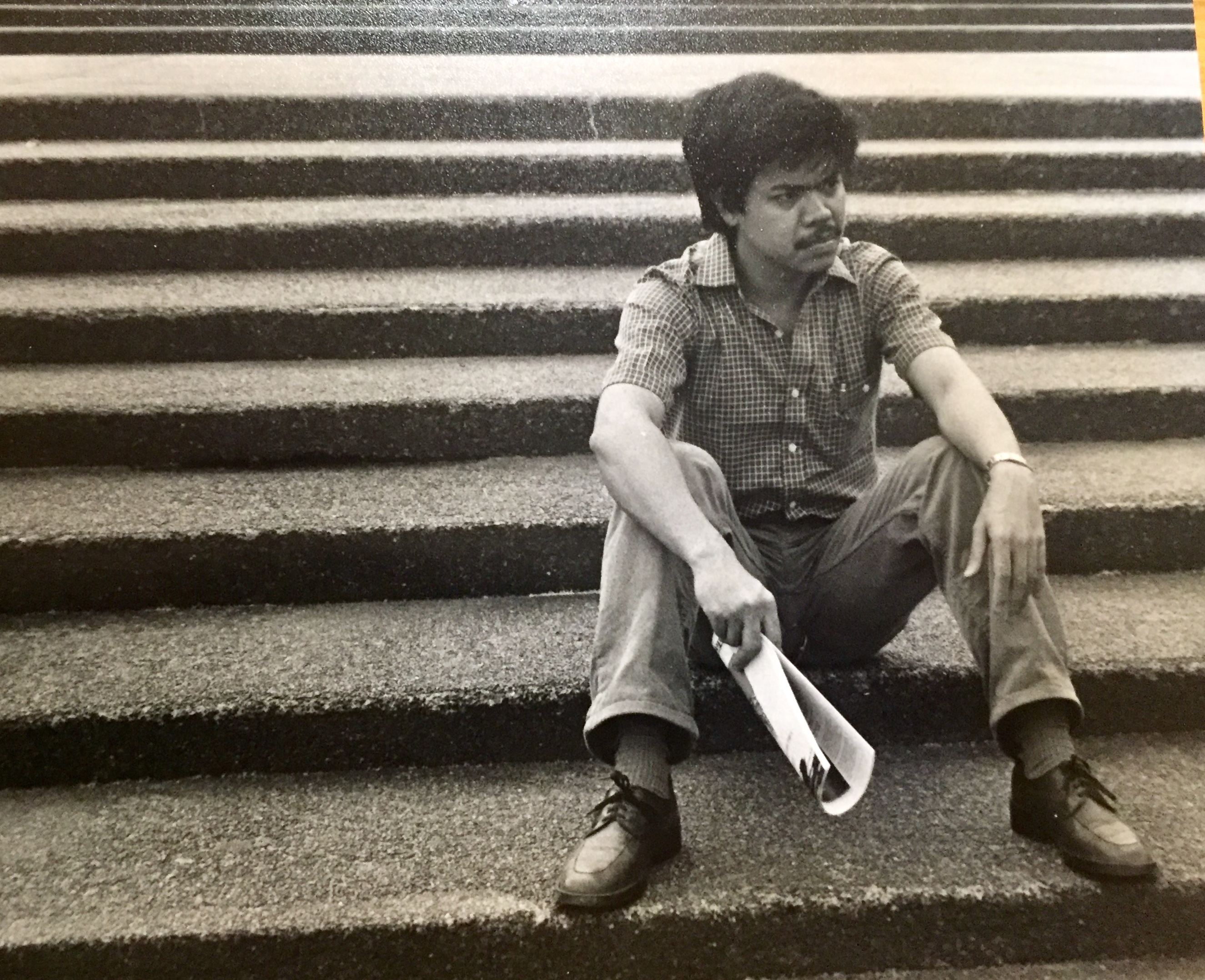
1983

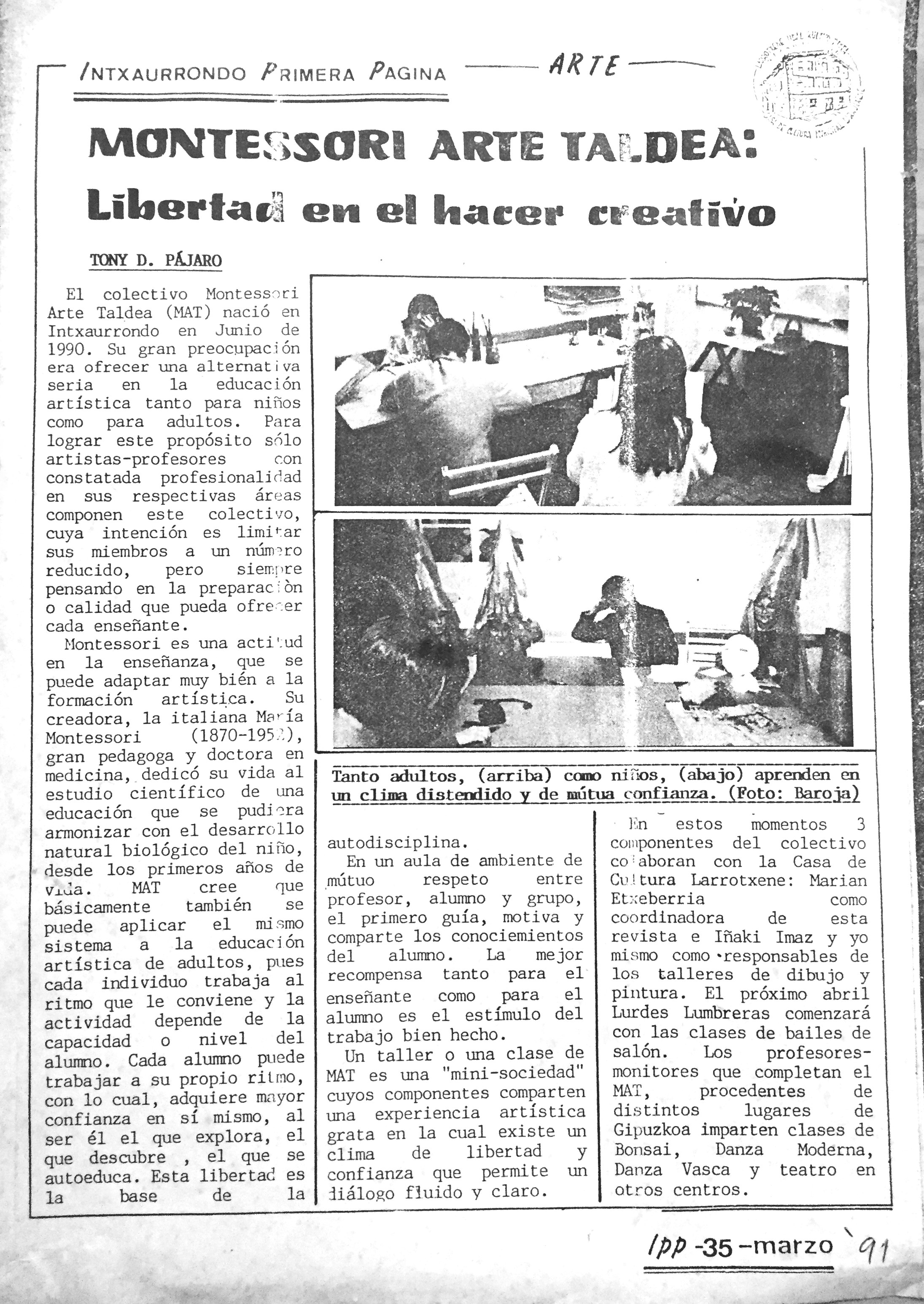
San Sebastián, 1991

== Work ==
He organised 26 exhibitions, for example in the following cities: Manila, Tokyo, San Sebastián, Pamplona, Zumarraga, Irura, Lasarte, Hernialde, Belauntza, Getafe, New York City, Las Vegas, Michigan, Chicago, California, Madrid, Barcelona, and Hendaye.

His first exhibition was organised in Manila in 1971.

The 1975 exhibition in Manila entitled "DAROYPAJARO" was organised jointly with paintings by Tony Daroy and Tony Pájaro at the Hyatt-Regency Hotel.

The 1991 exhibition in New York entitled "LUNTIAN: A Journey from the Philippines to Euskadi" was held at the United Nations Lobby in Manhattan for the first two weeks of July, and then continued for three weeks of the following month at the Philippine Center.

In 1998 he exhibited Philippine and Basque landscapes at the headquarters of the Colegio de Peritos e Ingenieros de Guipuzkoa in San Sebastián, and later also at the Sala de Exposiciones. Later, also in San Sebastián, in November 2004 he exhibited at the Sala Kutxa-Boulevard of the Caja de Ahorros Provincial de Guipuzkoa with landscapes of Cebu in the Philippines and of the municipal nurseries in Ulía, a neighbourhood of San Sebastián.

He has also organised exhibitions in Portugal and France. Some of his paintings were auctioned in Las Vegas (Nevada). He has painted several pictures commissioned by some Guipuzcoan municipalities. (Belauntza, Hernialde, Zumarraga) and in Philippines too (Mandaluyong).

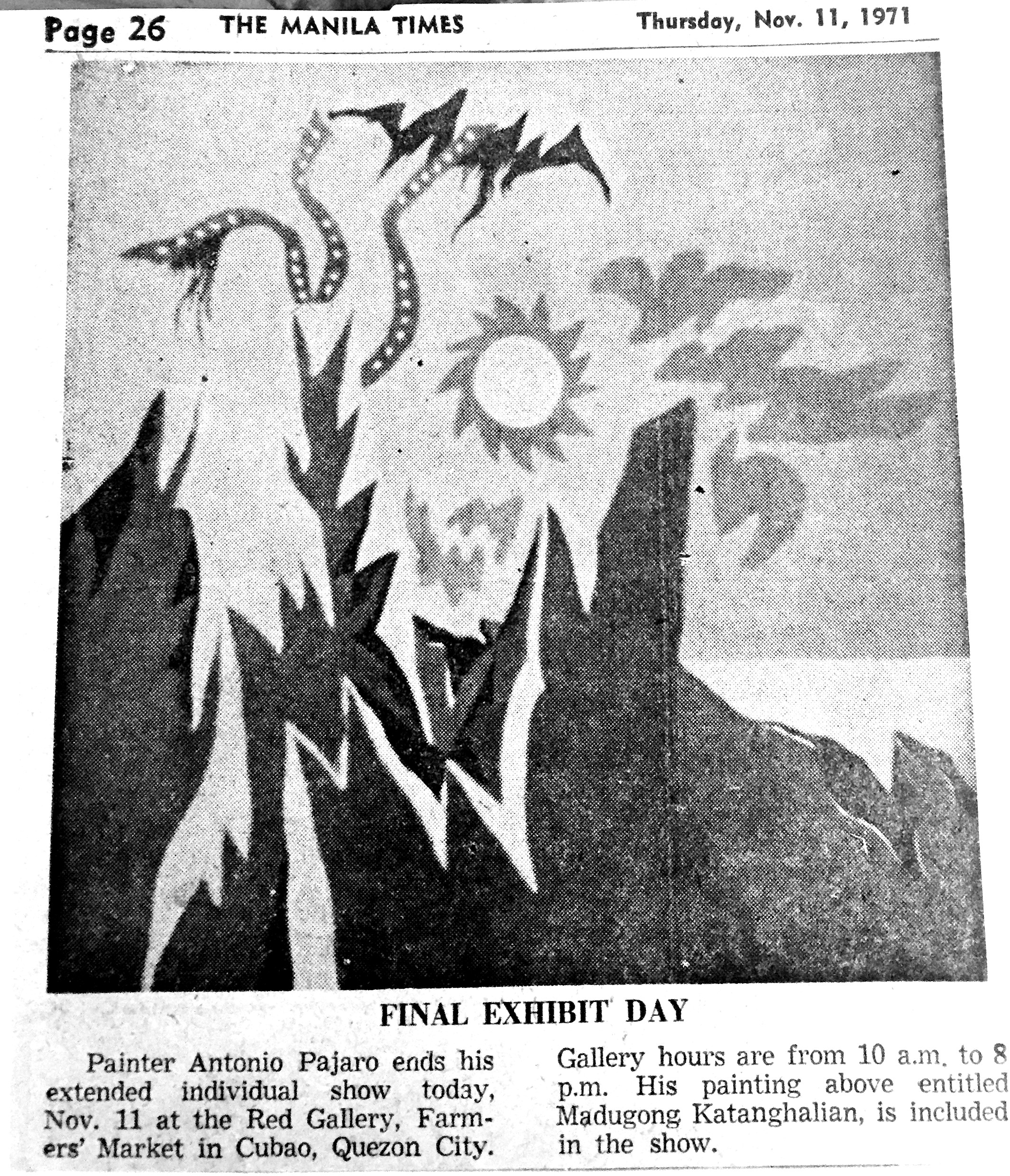
First exhibition (Manila 1971)

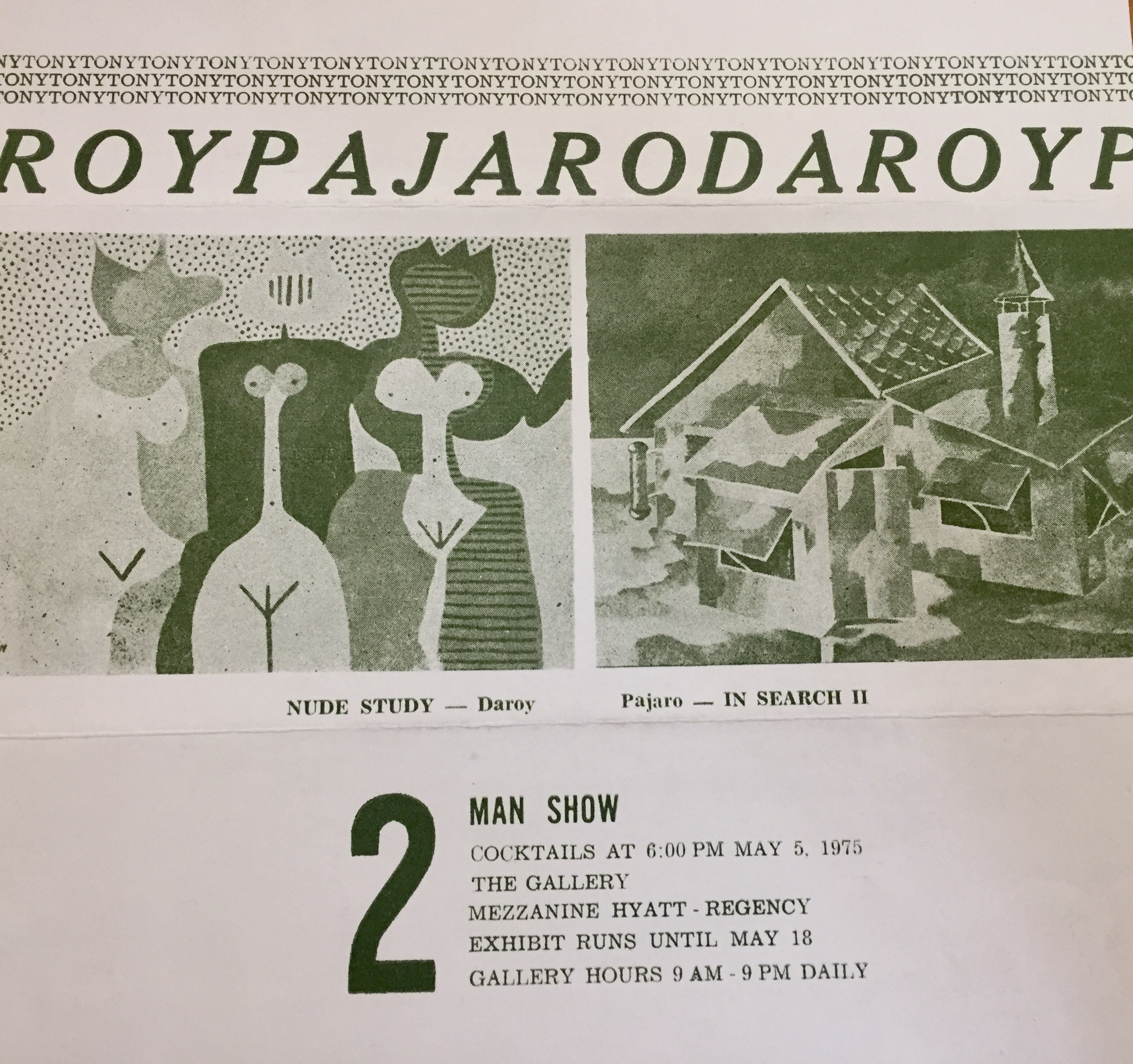
Exhibition in 1975

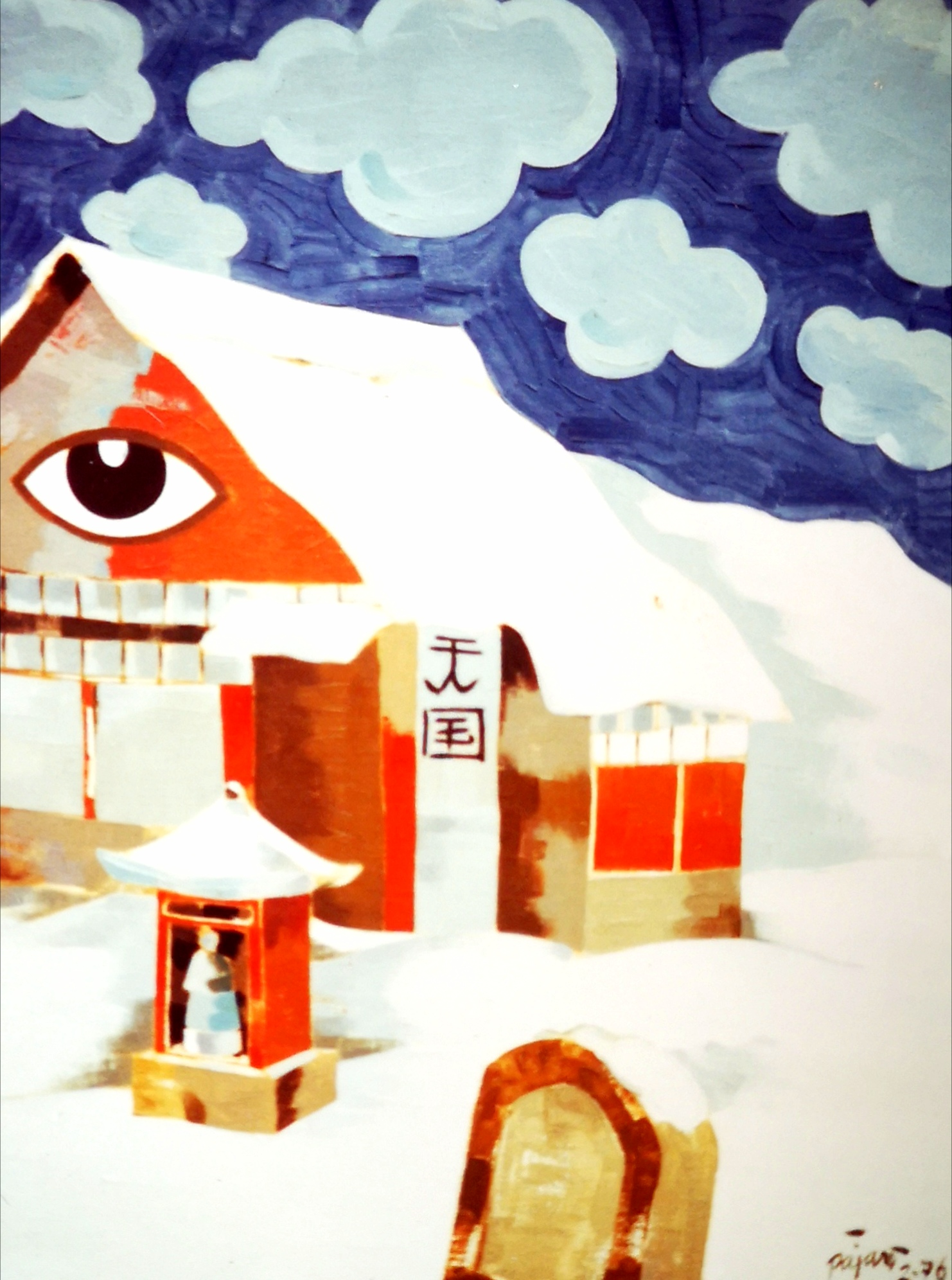
Needed home (Tokyo, 1976)

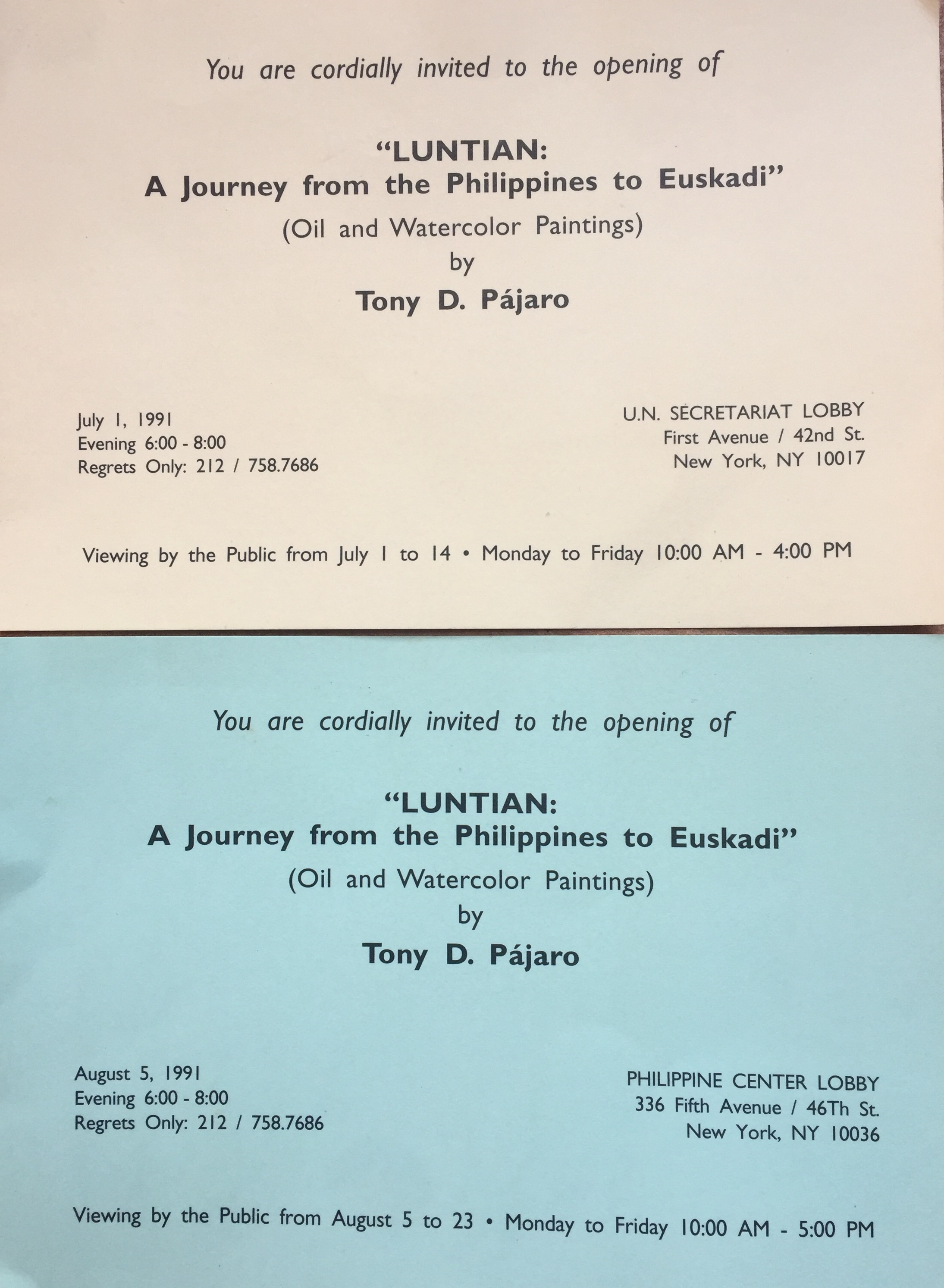
Manhattan, 1991

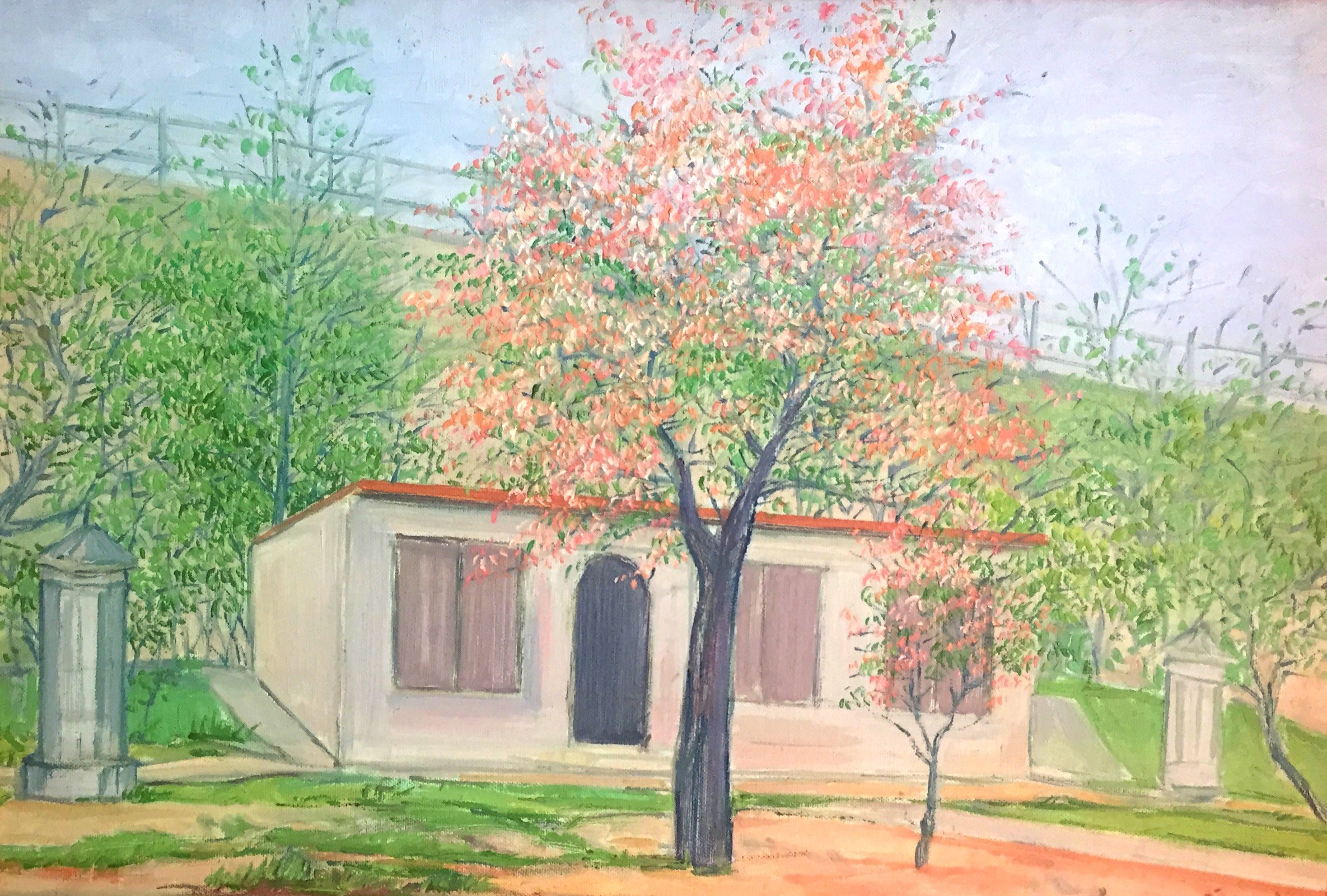
Huerto de la familia (Soroborda, San Sebastián, 1996)

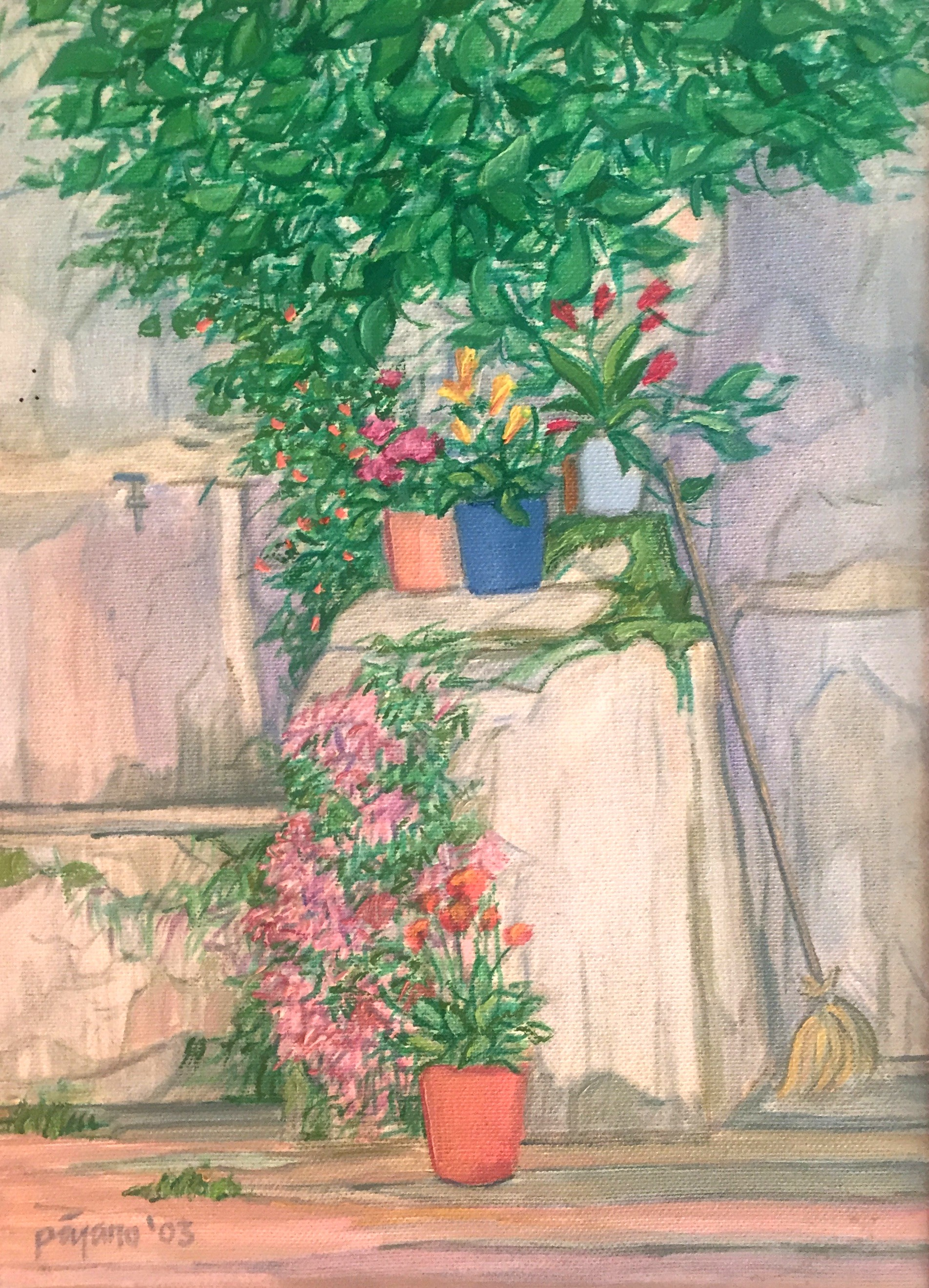
Park of Nurseries of Ulia

== Distinctions ==
- 1975: "Diploma of Honorary in Painting" UNESCO. Tokyo
- 1991: recipient Regional Council of Gipuzkoa Grant for artistic creation in painting.
- 1991: United Nations Exhibit. New York
- 1991: Philippine Center Exhibit. New York
- 1996; Grant for creation in painting from the Municipal Government of Mandaluyong in the Philippines.
