= Txabi Etxebarrieta =

Basque activist

- A stencil of Etxebarrieta's face on a house on the Casco Viejo neighborhood of Bilbao.
- Born: October 14, 1944; Bilbao, Spain
- Died: June 7, 1968 (aged 23); Tolosa, Gipuzkoa, Spain
- Cause of death: Gunshot wounds
- Occupations: Militant, poet and essayist
- Organization: ETA
- Known for: ETA ideologist, murder of José Antonio Pardines
- Political party: Basque nationalism

Txabi Etxebarrieta (14 October 1944 – 7 June 1968), also known as Xabier Etxebarrieta Ortiz, was a Basque nationalist and one of the founders of the armed pro-independence organization Euskadi ta Askatasuna (ETA). He was the perpetrator of the first assassination carried out by this group, and also the first ETA militant killed in a confrontation with the Civil Guard, for which he became an icon within the inner circle of the group and its supporters.

== Early life ==
Txabi Etxebarrieta was the third of four brothers. From childhood he suffered from bronchitis that affected him all his life. One of his older brothers was José Antonio Etxebarrieta, a defense lawyer for Xabier Izko de la Iglesia in the Burgos Trials that took place in 1970. He graduated with an Economics degree in 1967, specializing in computing from the University of the Basque Country.

== Fifth ETA assembly ==
In December 1966 and March 1967, he presided over the fifth assembly of ETA, which led to the first split within the organization. In the assembly, that took place over two sessions, tensions broke out between the workers’ faction, oriented more towards communism and further away from Basque nationalism, that at the time controlled the direction of ETA in the interior (i.e. Spain), and the other two factions, the so-called backward and race focused movements.

Etxebarrieta, his brother José Antonio and José María Eskubi from Navarre were the ones who headed the internal faction that expelled the more prominent members of the workers’ faction. The first part of the Assembly, held on the December 7th, 1966, in Gaztelu (Gipuzkoa), ratified the expulsion of the workers’ party member Patxi Iturrioz which was decided in advance by the Executive (leadership in exile), thus provoking the split of the workers’ faction into a new organization called ETA Berri (ETA nueva, in Spanish), later Komunistak, the embryo of what would later be the Communist Movement of Spain (MCE).

The rest of the militants automatically remained a part of what would be known as ETA Zaharra (old ETA) until 1968, until it became known as simply ETA again.

In the second part of the assembly, held in March 1967 in a house of prayer of the Jesuits of Guetaria, Txabi Etxebarrieta was elected a member of the Central Committee and the executive committee of the ETA. In that assembly, furthermore, the first steps began to be made towards the elaboration of their own revolutionary theory; Etxebarrieta originated the concept of a “Basque working nation”, used by the patriotic left of Basque nationalism since then. Likewise the activity of the organization was divided between four separate fronts: political, military, cultural, and workers’ concerns. In the latter, Etxebarrieta would have a prominent role.

Amongst others, Etxebarrieta incorporated Mario Onaindia in ETA, as Onaindia describes in his biography.

== First ETA assassination ==
On June 7, 1968, the car in which Etxebarrieta and Iñaki Sarasketa were traveling was stopped at a Civil Guard checkpoint in Aduna (Guipúzcoa). Fearing that they were discovered, Txabi Etxebarrieta got out of the car and shot the officer from behind, José Pardines Arcay. It was the first assassination carried out by ETA. ETA had not yet made the decision to carry out an armed struggle and because of this his partner that day, Sarasketa, years after stated:

“I guess that the civil guard officer noticed that the registration plate was false. At least, he suspected it. He asked us for the documentation and went around to check the car. Txabi told me “If he discovers it, I will kill him”...I answered him: “That’s not necessary, we will disarm him and leave”... We exited the car. The civil guard officer turned his back. He was squatting looking at the engine in the back… He muttered: “This doesn’t coincide…” Txabi took out the pistol and shot him. He fell face up. He shot him three or four more times in the chest. He had taken amphetamines and maybe that influenced it. In whatever case it was an ill-fated day. An error. He was an anonymous civil guard, a poor kid. There was no need for that man to die”.

The pistol was made by Astra-Unceta y Cia SA and sent to Germany during WWII.

== The death of Etxebarrieta ==
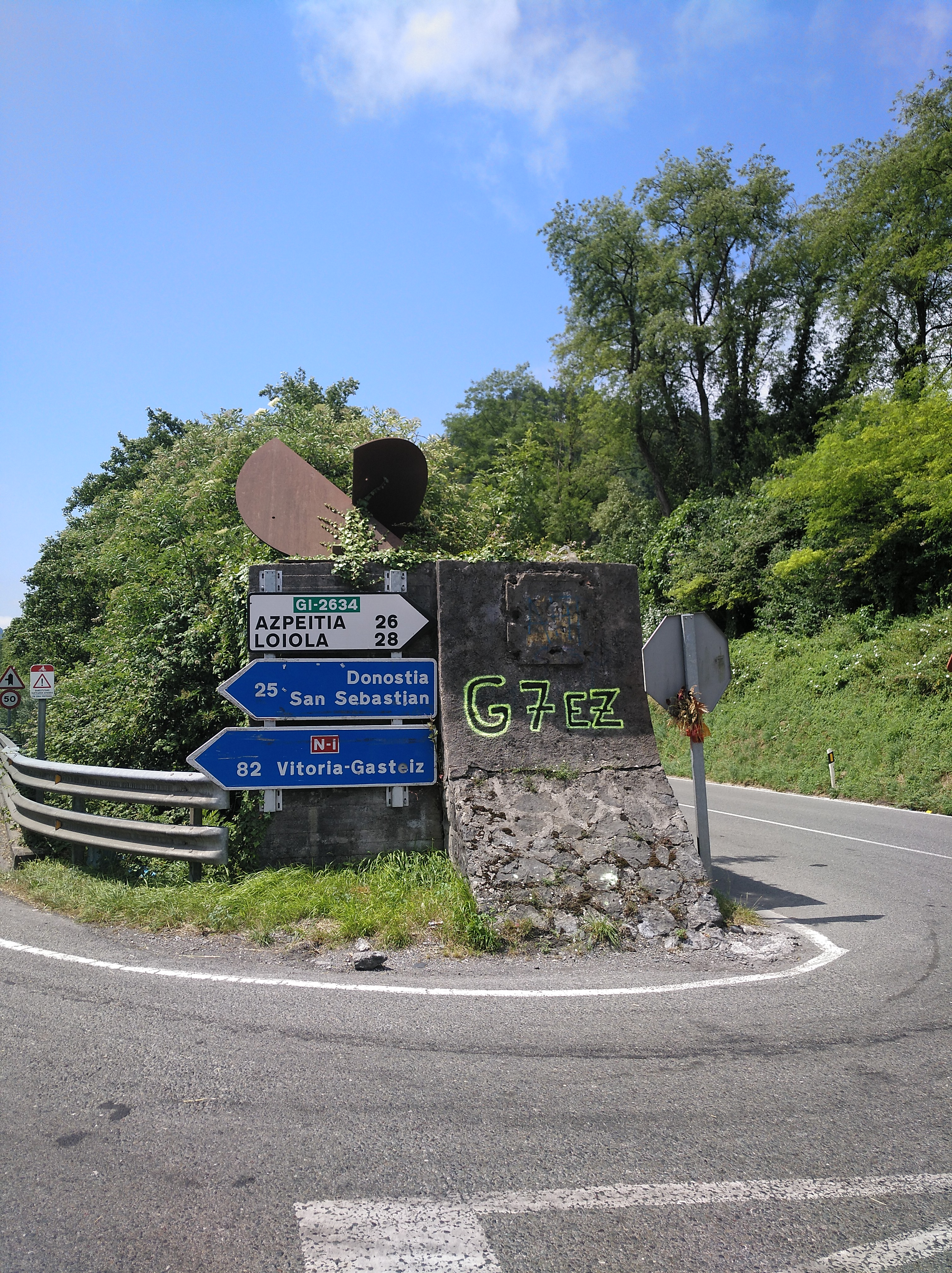
Sculpture by Jorge Oteiza in Benta Haundi Estela Homenaje a Txabi Etxebarrieta/Variante del Par móvil para una estela funeraria por fusilamiento, "Stela Homage to Txabi Etxebarrieta/Variant of the mobile pair for a funeral stela because of a shooting".

Etxebarrieta and Sarasketa fled the scene and took refuge in the house of a priest in Tolosa. After staying sheltered for some hours, they decided to abandon the parish house, being stopped immediately by agents of the Civil Guard that still did not know their identities. During the frisk they did not detect the pistol that Sarasketa was hiding, but they did find the pistol on Etxebarrieta, and a shootout began which resulted in the death of Txabi Etxebarrieta from two bullet wounds in Benta Haundi, near Tolosa. Iñaki Sarasketa was able to escape the shootout by holding the driver of a car at gunpoint, making him take him to the church of Errezil, where he hid out until he was detained the next day.

Sources close to the patriotic left of the Basque nationalist movement classify this death as an execution by the Civil Guard, despite the contrary claims of Sarasketa:

“In the same way that the amphetamines made him euphoric, two hours after they plunged him into a panic attack. We left the house and we were detained by a pair of Civil Guard. We both carried a pistol in our belt. First they searched me, and they didn't notice it. I remember that the civil guard who searched Txabi let out a scream. And afterwards, a typical scene of the west, of those to see who shot first… The civil guard shot before I did and I left running… I didn’t know at that moment that Txabi had died… I stopped a car, threatened the driver and forced him to take me in the direction of Régil (near Zarautz). He happened to be a distant relative of mine. I knew the pistol gave me away and I thought to drop it. The driver asked me not to. If they stopped us it would seem more real that I was forcing him to drive. Also he realized I had no intention of harming him, so a few kilometers further he asked me to get out…And I continued walking…”

Afterwards Sarasketa was summoned to a Court Martial, the first since the Spanish Civil War, in which he was condemned to death. With the intercession before Francisco Franco, of the General of the Jesuits, father Pedro Arrupe, the death sentence was commuted to a life sentence; Sarasketa, brutally beaten, was hospitalized in prison, where he spent nine years until the amnesty of 1977.

== Consequences ==
After the death of Txabi, ETA published political pamphlets with the following text:

“In the face of so much sensationalism and so much biased information on the part of the Fascist-Capitalist journalism apparatus, ETA comes forward to make known to the public the death of Xabier Etxebarrieta. Txabi Etxebarrieta was assassinated in Tolosa, there is no doubt. The eye witnesses, the burned holes in the shirt, and the autopsy effectively confirm it. The keepers of the capitalist order show their methods: Txabi Etebarrieta was removed from the car and without even asking for his documents he was handcuffed, put against the wall and killed with a shot to the heart, at point blank(...)”

The second of August, in retaliation for the death of Etxebarrieta and for being considered a torturer, ETA assassinated the police commander Melitón Manzanas, which led to a state of emergency being declared in the Basque region.

Ten years after the events of Benta Haundi, ETA also assassinated sergeant Acedo Panizo, one of the members of the unit under whom Etxebarrieta died.

For a period there was a bust of Etxebarrieta in the plaza of Urretxindorra, situated in the Bilbao neighborhood of Otxarkoaga, until it was removed by the local government of Bilbao in September 2004, due to protests from various groups.

On 2 June 2018 he was commemorated in Tolosa by 300 people.

== Family ==
He was the uncle of Natxo Etxebarrieta, singer of the punk rock band named Cicatriz; and Aitziber Ibaibarriaga Etxebarrieta, a Bildu politician.

== Literary work ==
Etxebarrieta was a poet and writer, although unpublished in his life, his work is collected in Poesía y otros escritos. 1961–1967.
