= Berastegi =

Coordinates: 43°07′27″N 1°58′45″W

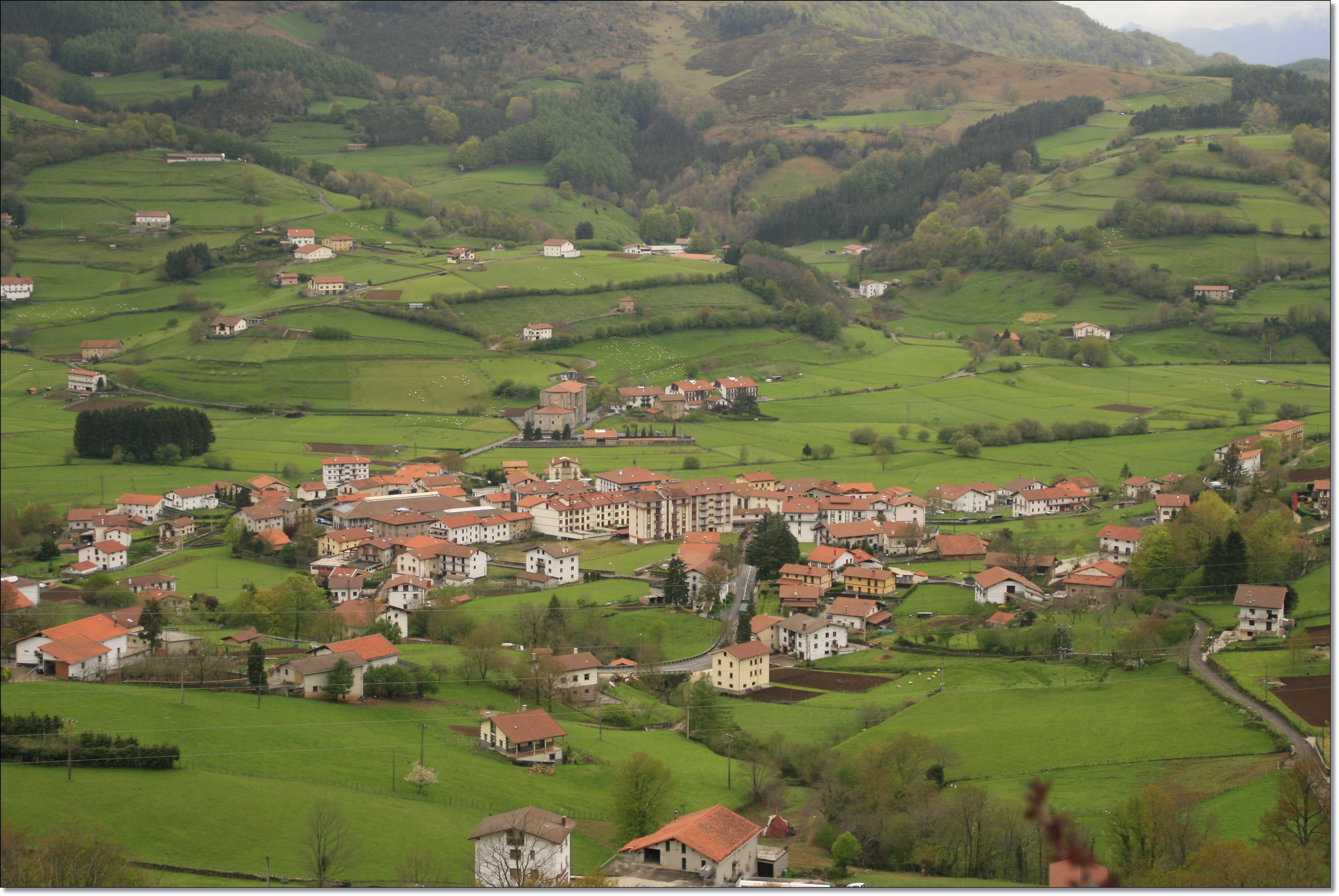
- View of Berastegi

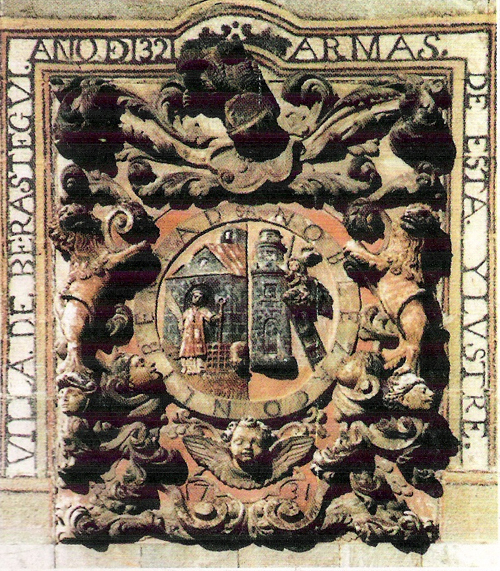
- Coat of arms

- Location in Spain.
- Country: Spain
- Autonomous community: Gipuzkoa

Area
  - Total: 45.90 km^{2} (17.72 sq mi)

Population (2025-01-01)
  - Total: 1,114
  - Density: 24.27/km^{2} (62.86/sq mi)
- Time zone: UTC+1 (CET)
  - Summer (DST): UTC+2 (CEST)
- Website: www.berastegi.eus

Berastegi (Spanish: Berástegui) is a town located in the province of Gipuzkoa, in the autonomous community of Basque Country, northern Spain, at the shores of the river Elduaran or Berastegi, at 1° 58' 45" west and 43° 07' 27" north, and at an altitude of 400 m. It borders Ibarra to the north, with Eldua to the east, and to the south and west with Belauntza.
