= Irisarri =

Irisarri is a surname. Notable people with the surname include:

- Antonio José de Irisarri (1786–1868), Guatemalan statesman, journalist, and politician
- Hermógenes Irisarri (1819–1886), Chilean poet, journalist, diplomat, and political figure
- Jon Irisarri (born 1995), Spanish cyclist
- Rafael Anton Irisarri, American composer, multi-instrumentalist, producer, and media artist

== See also ==
- Irissarry
