= Berrobi =

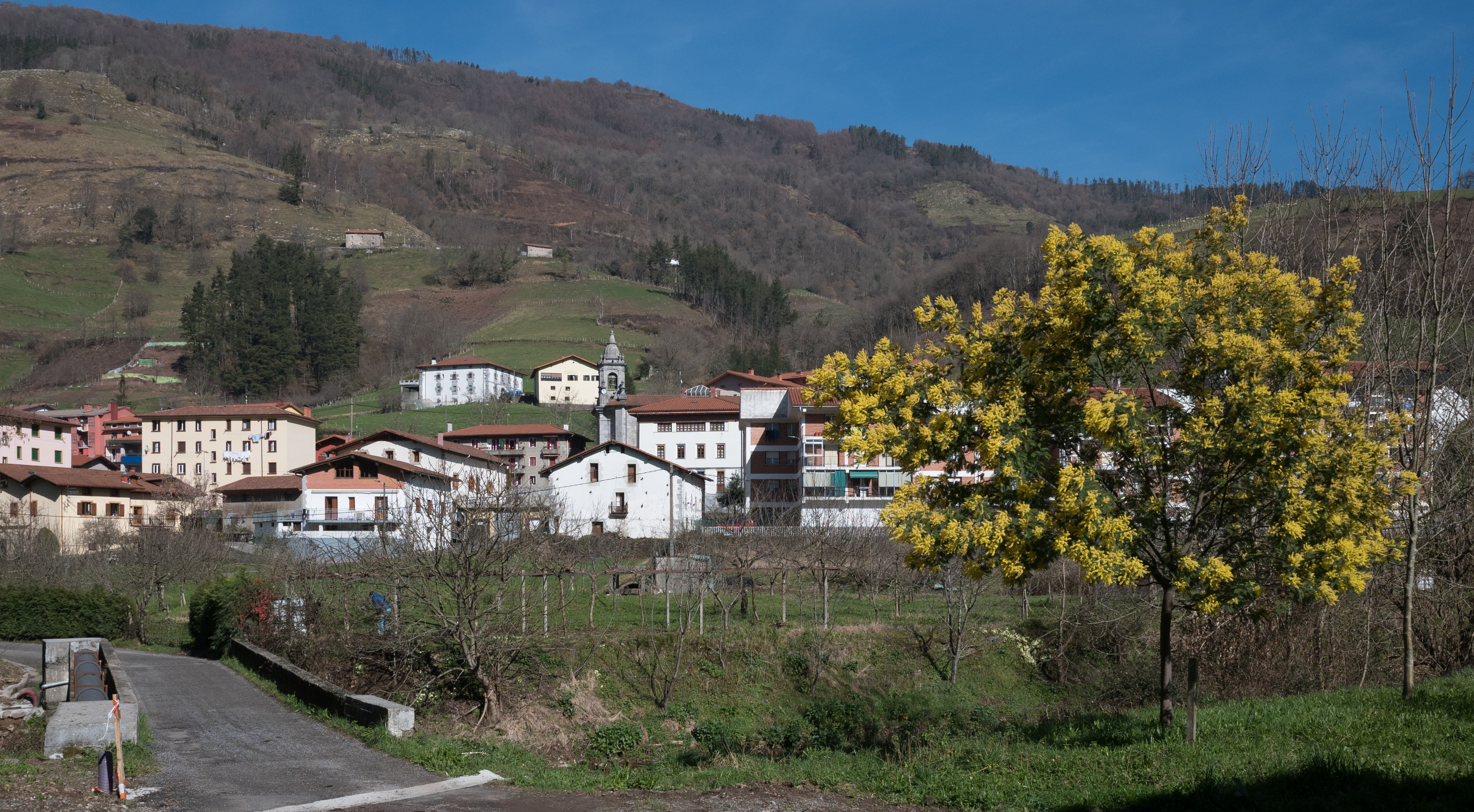
- View of Berrobi. Gipuzkoa, Basque Country, Spain

- Coat of arms

- Location of Berrobi within the Basque Country Location of Berrobi within Spain
- Coordinates: 43°08′44″N 2°01′36″W
- Country: Spain
- Autonomous community: Basque Country
- Province: Gipuzkoa
- Comarca: Tolosaldea

Government
  - Mayor: Joseba Iñigo Ayerza Mugica

Area
  - Total: 3 km^{2} (1.2 sq mi)
- Elevation: 161 m (528 ft)

Population (2025-01-01)
  - Total: 551
  - Density: 180/km^{2} (480/sq mi)
- Time zone: UTC+1 (CET)
  - Summer (DST): UTC+2 (CEST)
- Postal code: 20493

Berrobi is a town located in the province of Gipuzkoa, in the autonomous community of Basque Country, northern Spain.
