= Abaltzisketa =

- Municipality
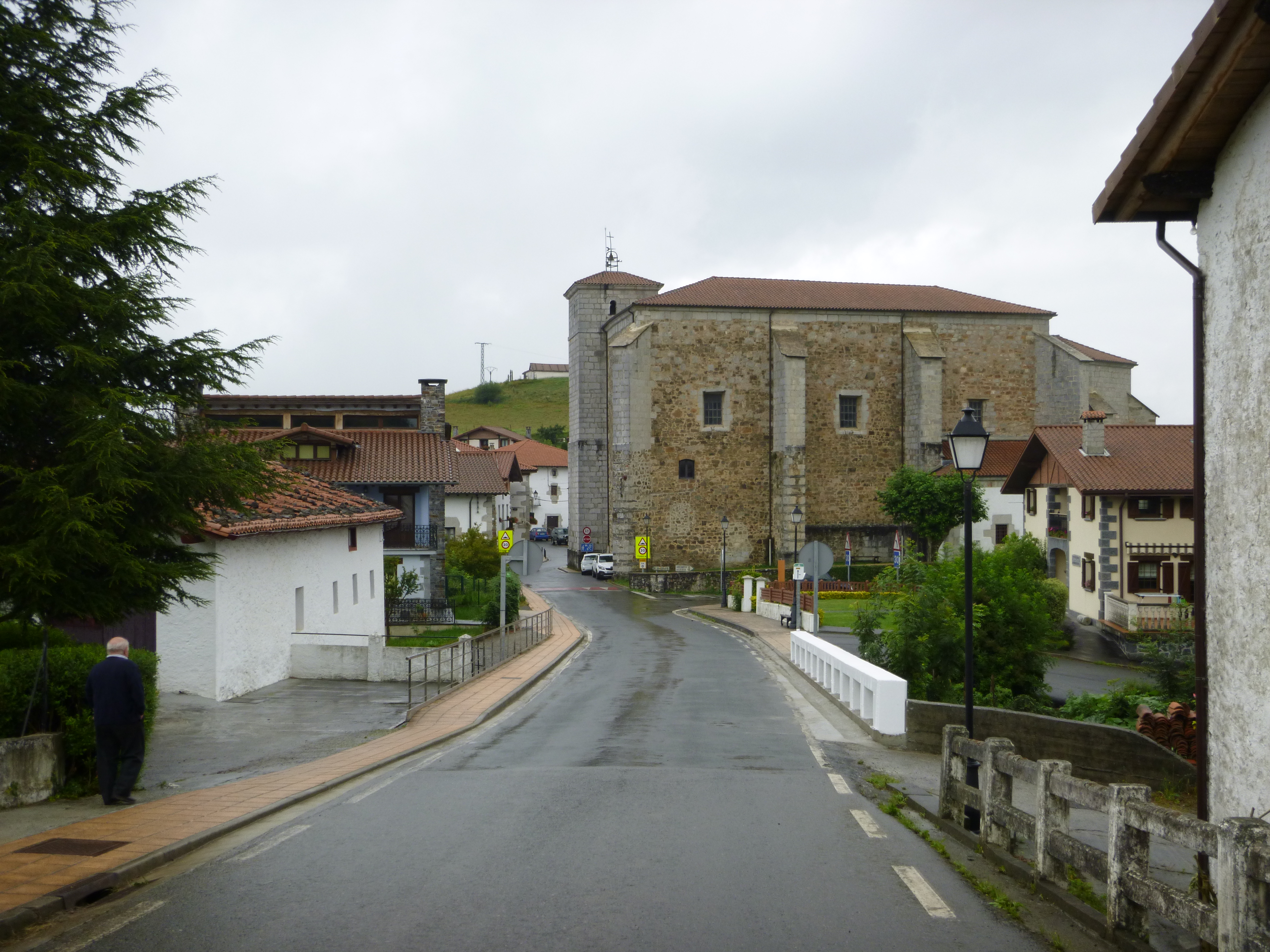
- Abaltzisketa

- Coat of arms

- Location of Abaltzisketa within the Basque Autonomous Community
- Coordinates: 43°10′N 2°9′W
- Country: Spain
- Autonomous community: Basque Country
- Province: Gipuzkoa
- Comarca: Tolosaldea

Government
  - Mayor: Jon Zubizarreta Aldaya

Population (2025-01-01)
  - Total: 321
- Time zone: UTC+1 (CET)
  - Summer (DST): UTC+2 (CEST)
- Postal code: 20269
- Dialing code: 34 (Spain) + 943 (Gipuzkoa)
- Website: Official website

Abaltzisketa ([aβalts̻is̺keta]) is a town located in the province of Gipuzkoa, in the autonomous community of Basque Country, in the north of Spain. In 2014, Abaltzisketa had a total population of 329.
