= Larraul =

- Municipality
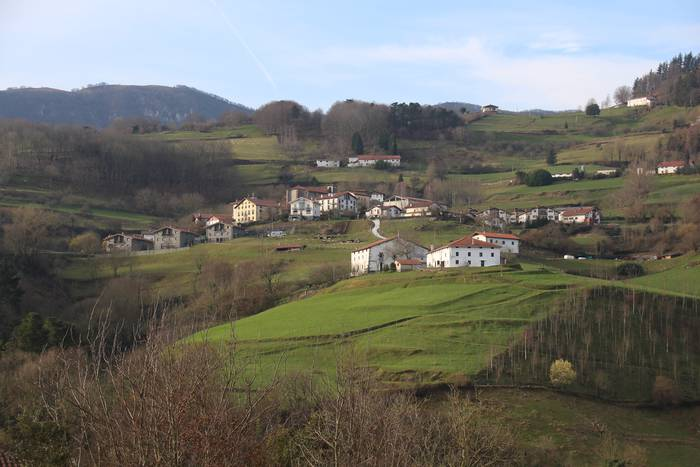
- Larraul as seen from Asteasu

- Flag Coat of arms

- Location of Larraul within the Basque Country Location of Larraul within Spain
- Coordinates: 43°11′17″N 2°06′09″W
- Country: Spain
- Autonomous community: Basque Country
- Province: Gipuzkoa
- Eskualde: Tolosaldea

Government
  - Mayor: María Teresa Arana Pérez (PSE-EE)

Area
  - Total: 5.9 km^{2} (2.3 sq mi)

Population (2025-01-01)
  - Total: 263
  - Density: 45/km^{2} (120/sq mi)
- Demonym: Basque: larrauldar
- Time zone: UTC+1 (CET)
  - Summer (DST): UTC+2 (CEST)
- Official language(s): Basque; Spanish
- Website: Official website

Larraul is a town and municipality located in the province of Gipuzkoa, in the autonomous community of Basque Country, northern Spain.
