= Alegia =

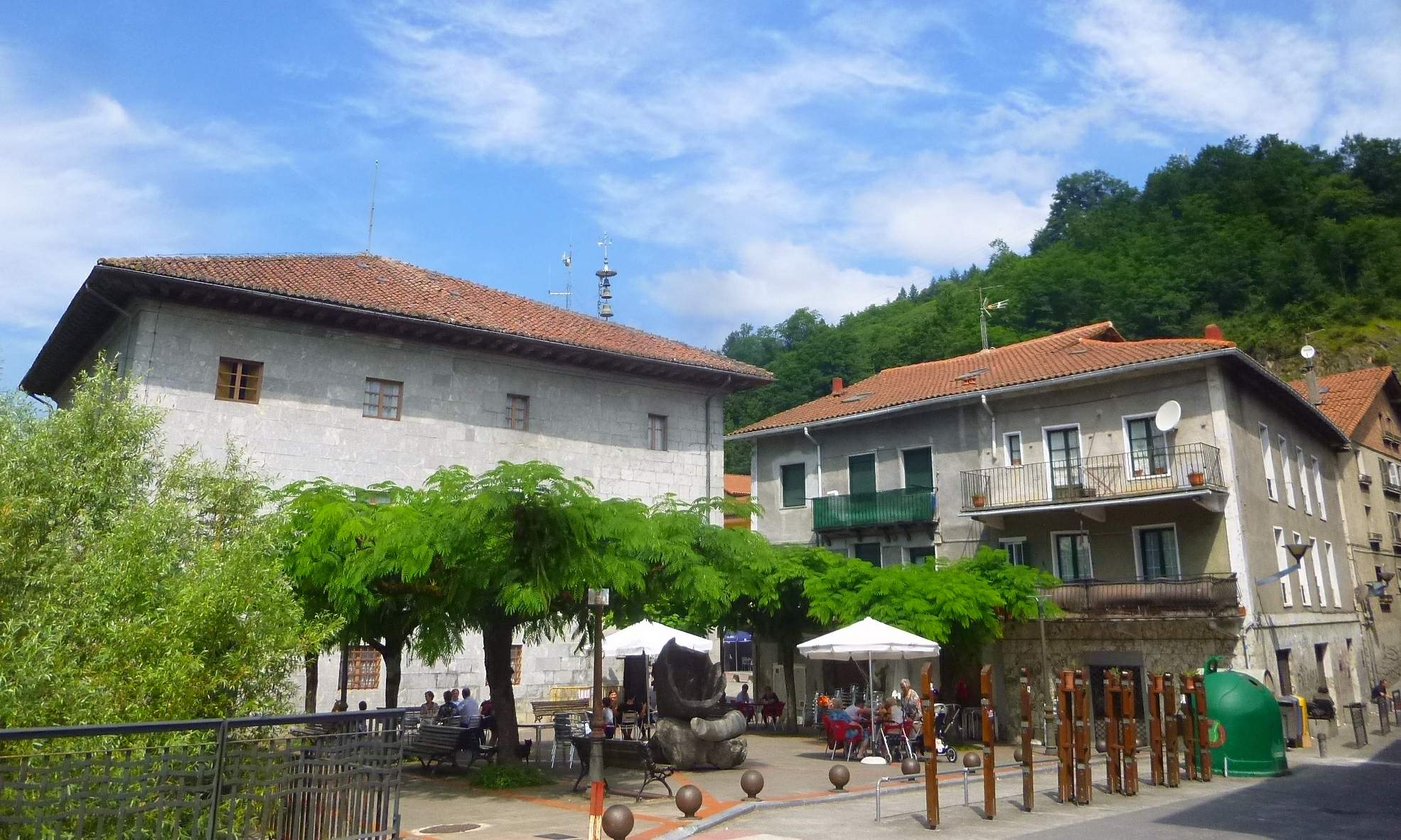

- Coat of arms

- Location of Alegia within the Basque Country Location of Alegia within Spain
- Coordinates: 43°06′02″N 2°05′54″W
- Country: Spain
- Autonomous community: Basque Country
- Province: Gipuzkoa
- Comarca: Tolosaldea

Government
  - Mayor: Unai Iraola Aguirrezabala

Area
  - Total: 7.59 km^{2} (2.93 sq mi)
- Elevation: 94 m (308 ft)

Population (2025-01-01)
  - Total: 1,813
  - Density: 239/km^{2} (619/sq mi)
- Time zone: UTC+1 (CET)
  - Summer (DST): UTC+2 (CEST)
- Postal code: 20260
- Website: www.alegia.net

Alegia (Spanish: Alegría de Oria) is a town located in the province of Gipuzkoa, in the autonomous community of the Basque Country, in the North of Spain. In 2014 Alegia had a total population of 1,744.

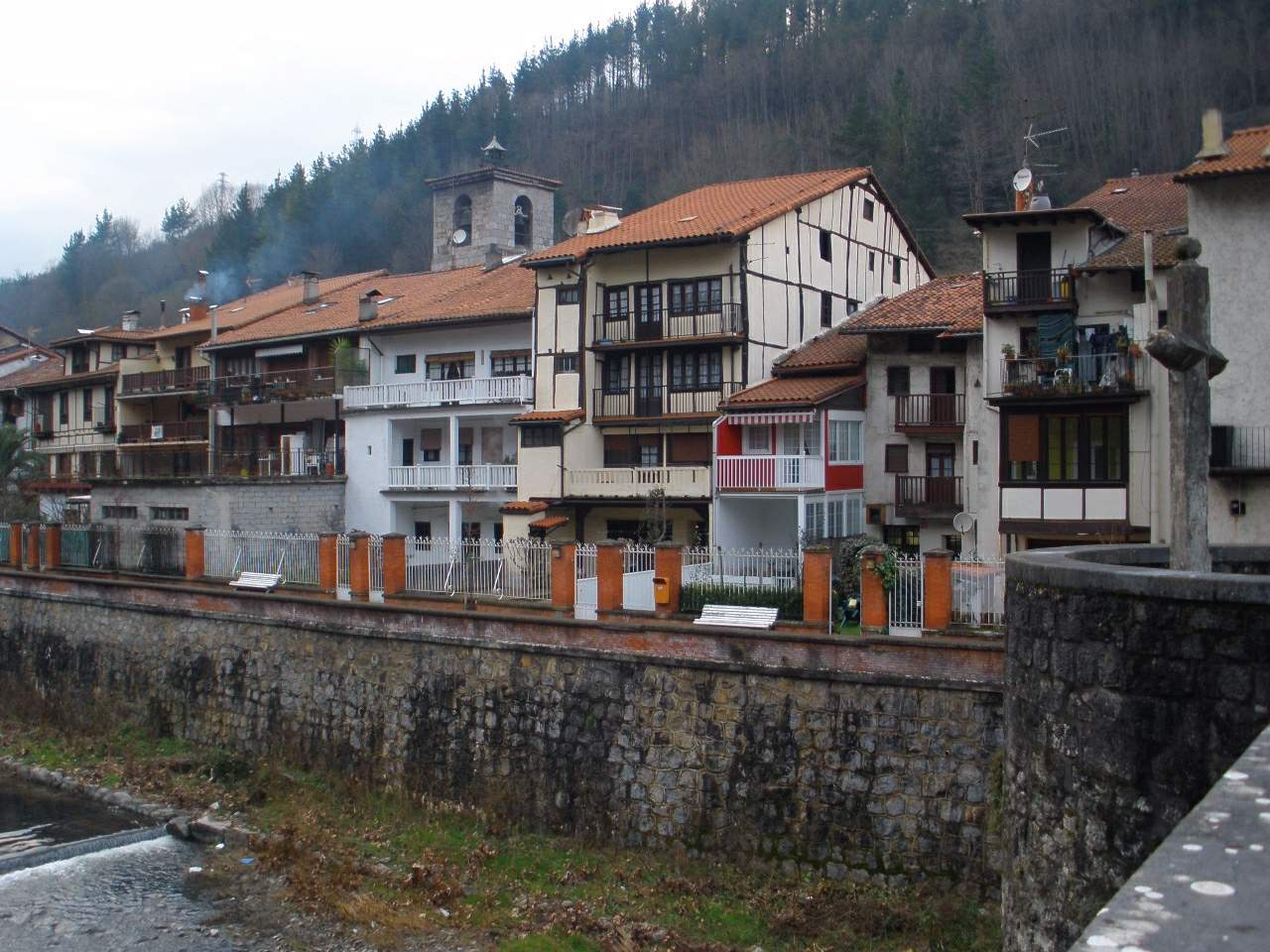
Alegia
