= Orexa =

- Municipality
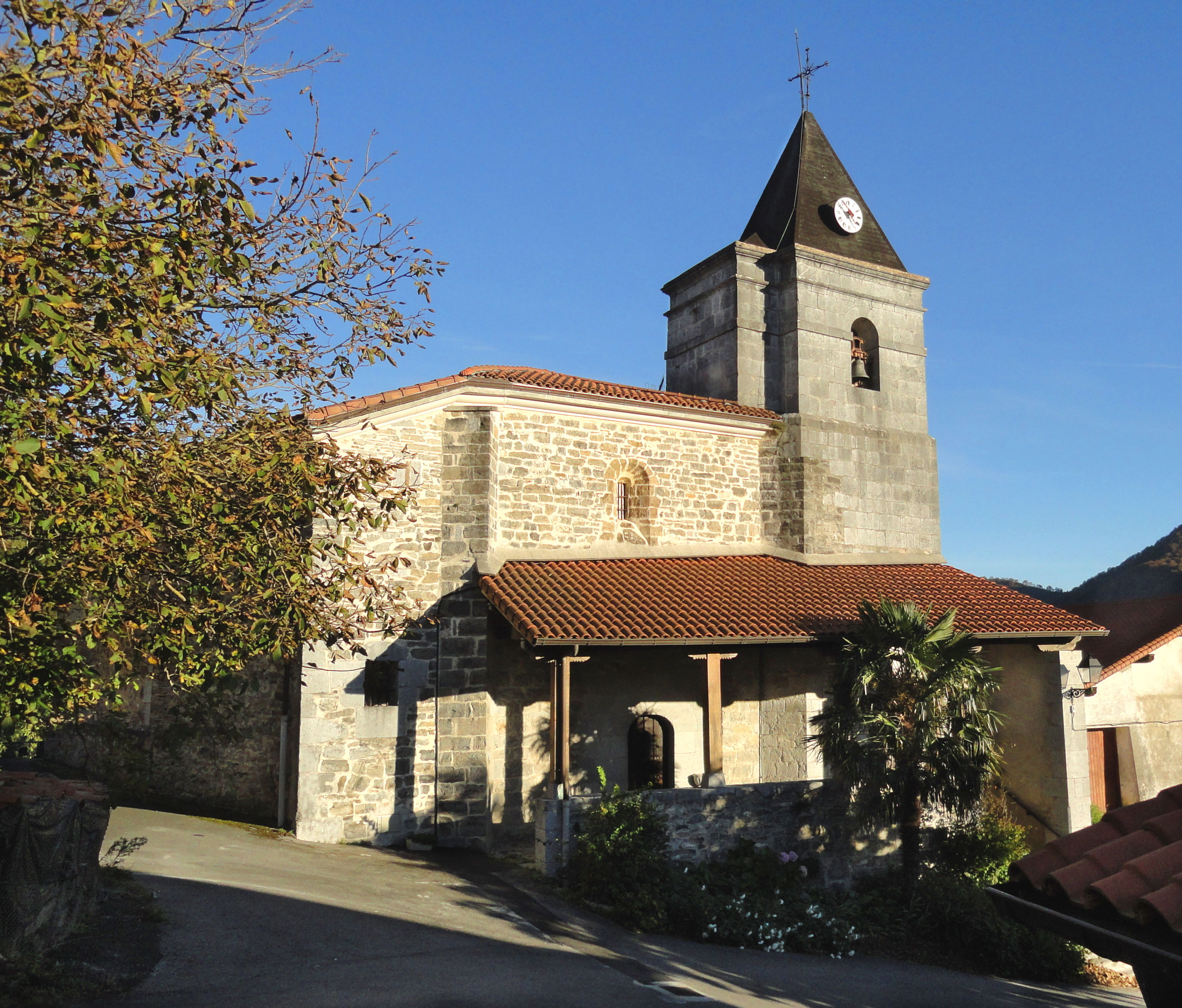
- A church in Orexa

- Coat of arms

- Location of Orexa within the Basque Country Orexa (Spain)
- Coordinates: 43°05′39″N 2°00′41″W
- Country: Spain
- Autonomous community: Basque Country
- Province: Gipuzkoa
- Comarca: Tolosaldea

Government
  - Mayor: Eneko Maioz Ganboa (Bildu)

Area
  - Total: 5.85 km^{2} (2.26 sq mi)
- Elevation: 420 m (1,380 ft)

Population (2025-01-01)
  - Total: 103
  - Density: 17.6/km^{2} (45.6/sq mi)
- Demonym(s): Spanish: Orejarra; Basque: Orexarra
- Time zone: UTC+1 (CET)
  - Summer (DST): UTC+2 (CEST)
- Postal code: 20490

Orexa (Spanish, Oreja) is a town located in the province of Gipuzkoa, in the Autonomous Community of Basque Country, northern Spain.
