= Jon Irisarri =

Spanish cyclist

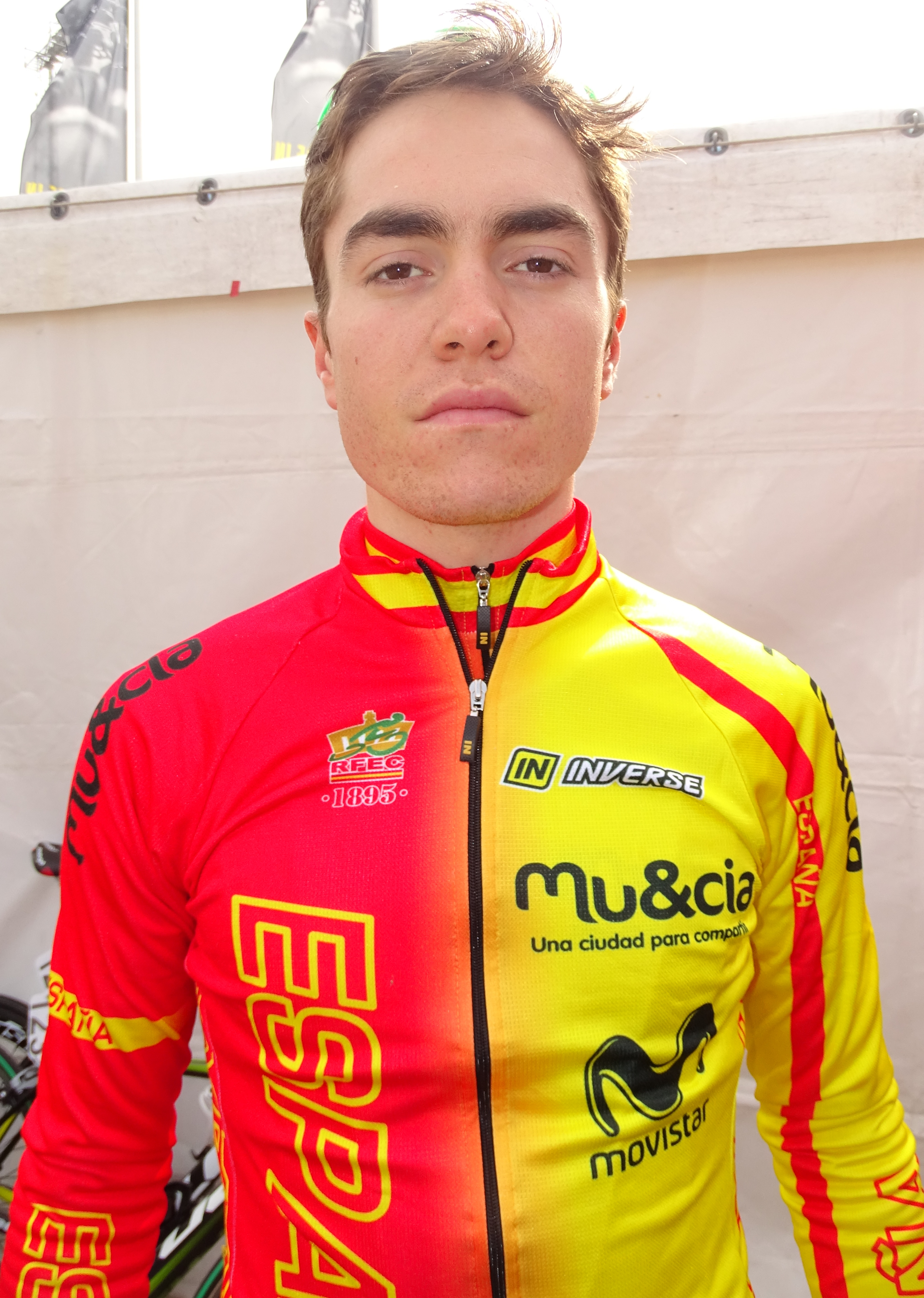
- Irisarri in 2016.

Personal information
- Full name: Jon Irisarri Rincón
- Born: 9 November 1995 (age 30) Leaburu, Spain
- Height: 1.75 m (5 ft 9 in)
- Weight: 66 kg (146 lb)

Cycling career
- Sport: Cycling
- Current team: Retired
- Discipline: Road
- Role: Rider

Amateur teams
- 2014–2015: EDP Energía
- 2014: Euskadi (stagiaire)
- 2016: Caja Rural–Seguros RGA amateur
- 2016: Caja Rural–Seguros RGA (stagiaire)

Professional team
- 2017–2021: Caja Rural–Seguros RGA

Jon Irisarri Rincón (born 9 November 1995 in Leaburu) is a Spanish former cyclist, who competed as a professional from 2017 to 2021 for UCI ProTeam Caja Rural–Seguros RGA.

== Major results ==
2016
2nd Road race, National Under-23 Road Championships
4th Overall Volta a Portugal do Futuro
