= Ikaztegieta =

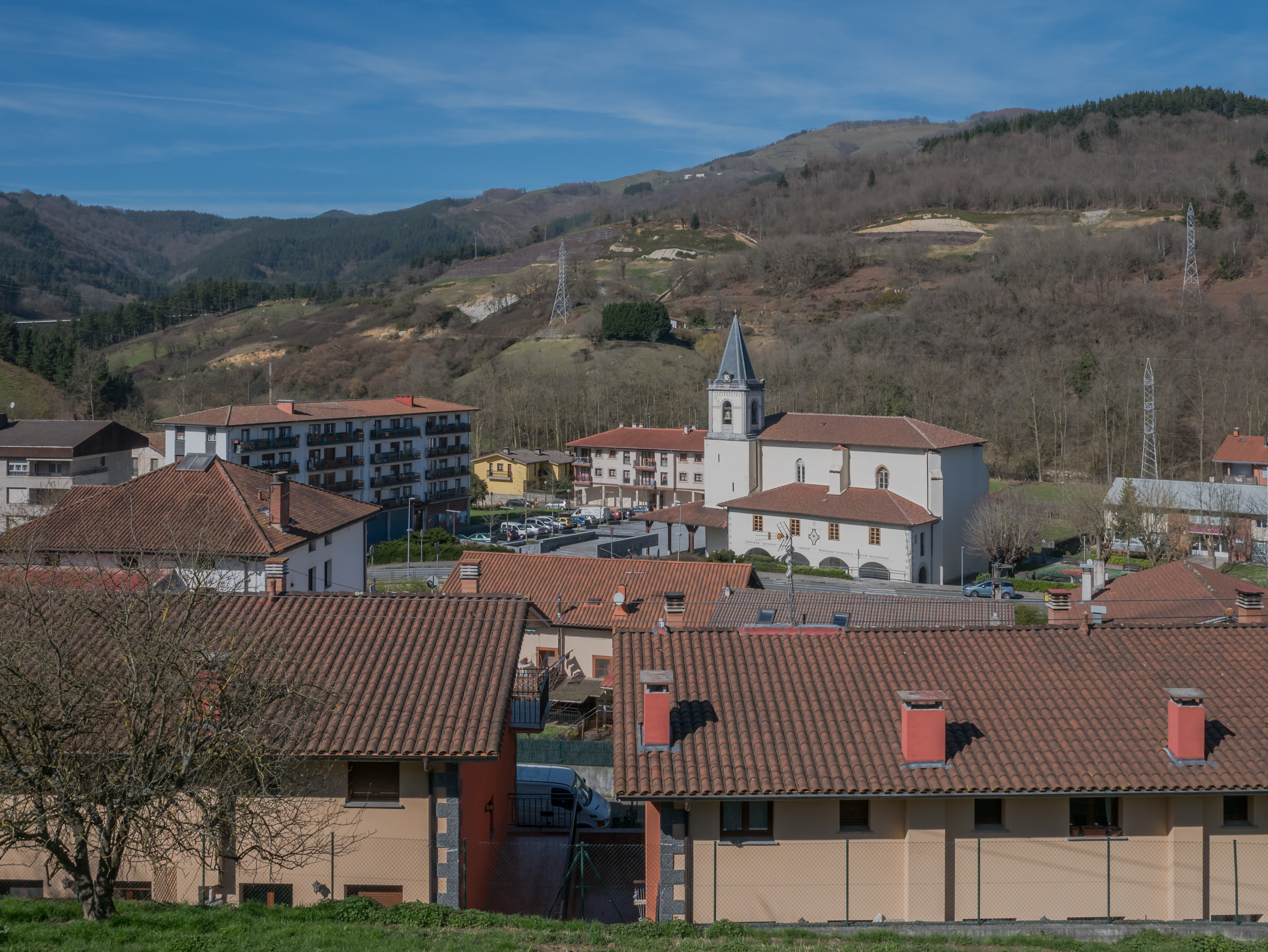
- Ikaztegieta

- Coat of arms

- Location in the Basque Country#Location in Spain Ikaztegieta (Spain)
- Coordinates: 43°5′41″N 2°07′31″W
- Country: Spain
- Autonomous community: Basque Country
- Province: Gipuzkoa
- Eskualdea: Tolosaldea

Government
  - Mayor: Iker Otamendi Ibarguren

Area
  - Total: 2.00 km^{2} (0.77 sq mi)
- Elevation: 110 m (360 ft)

Population (2025-01-01)
  - Total: 498
  - Density: 249/km^{2} (645/sq mi)
- Time zone: UTC+1 (CET)
  - Summer (DST): UTC+2 (CEST)
- Website: www.ikaztegieta.eus

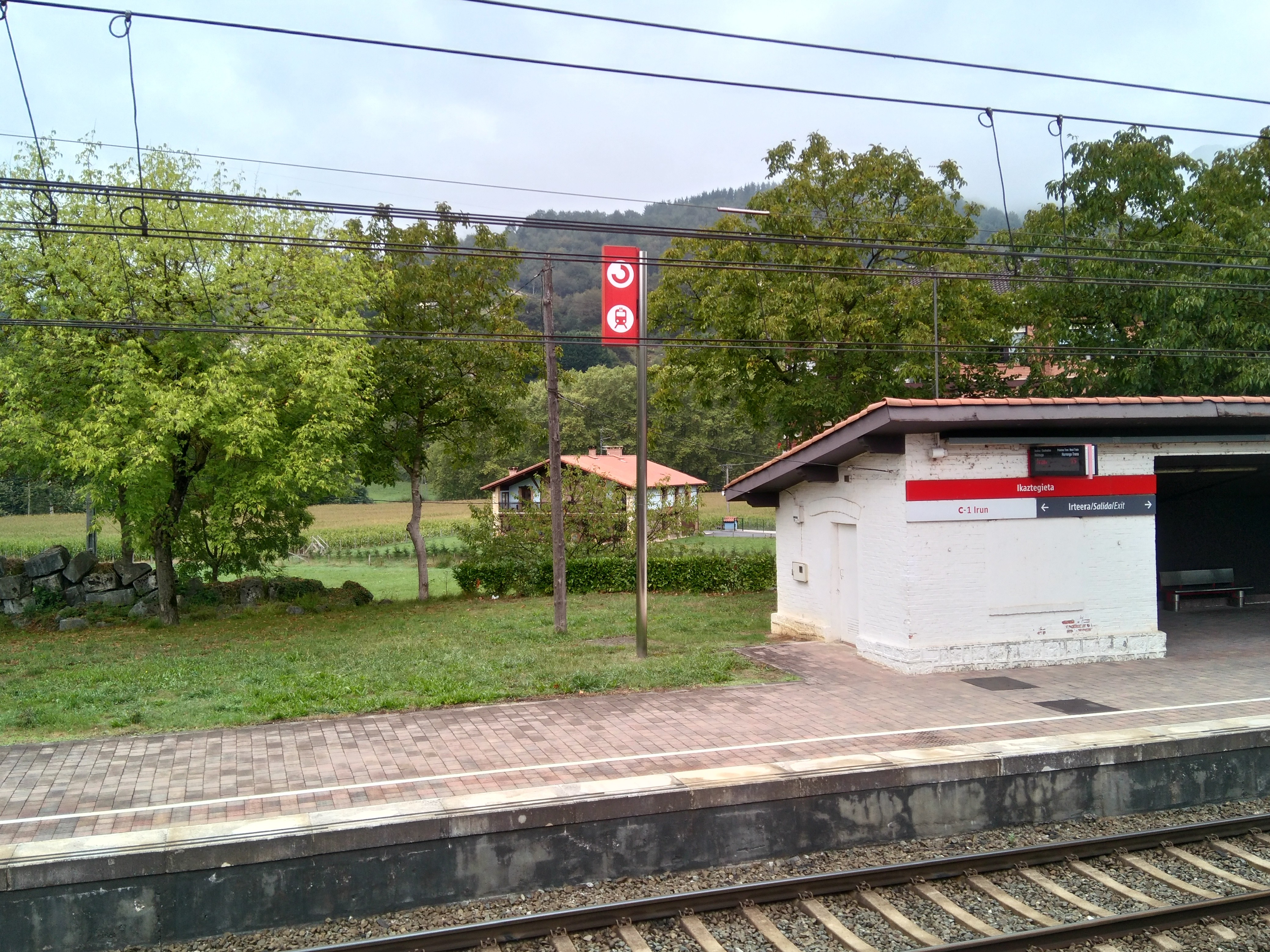
Ikaztegieta Train Station

Ikaztegieta (Spanish, Icazteguieta) is a town located in the province of Gipuzkoa, in the Autonomous Community of Basque Country, northern Spain.
