= Orendain =

Town in Gipuzkoa, Spain

Coordinates: 43°04′46″N 2°06′51″W

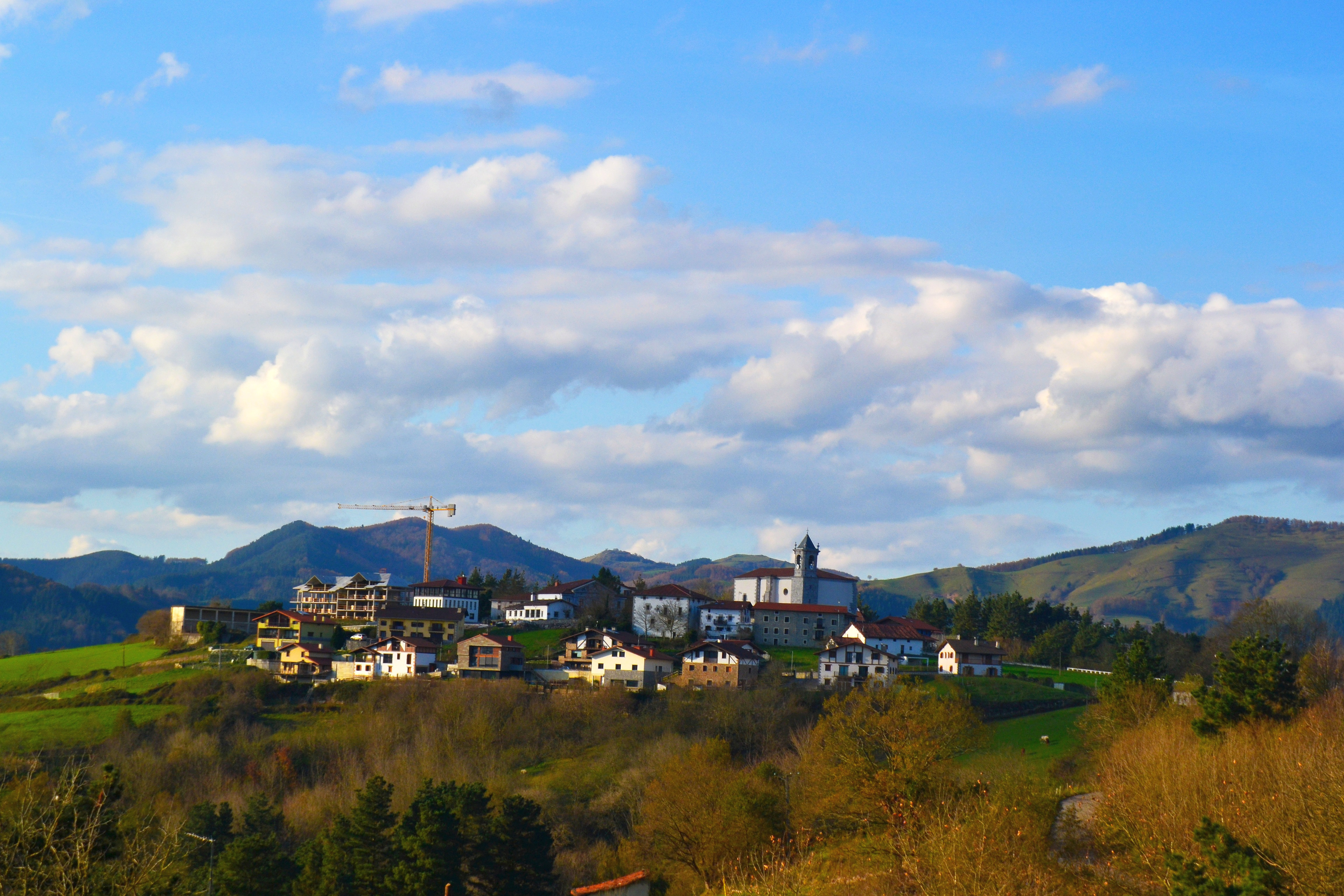
View of Orendain

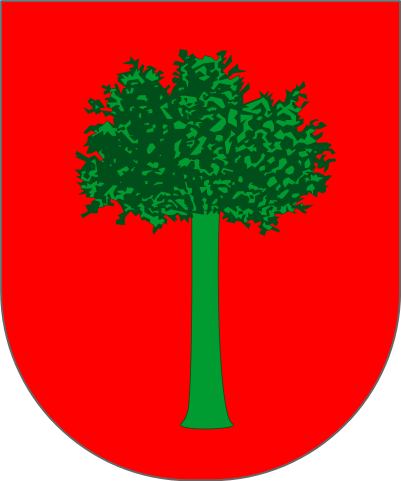
Orendain's coat of arms

Orendain (Spanish: Orendáin) is a town located in the province of Gipuzkoa, in the autonomous community of Basque Country, northern Spain.
