= Hernialde =

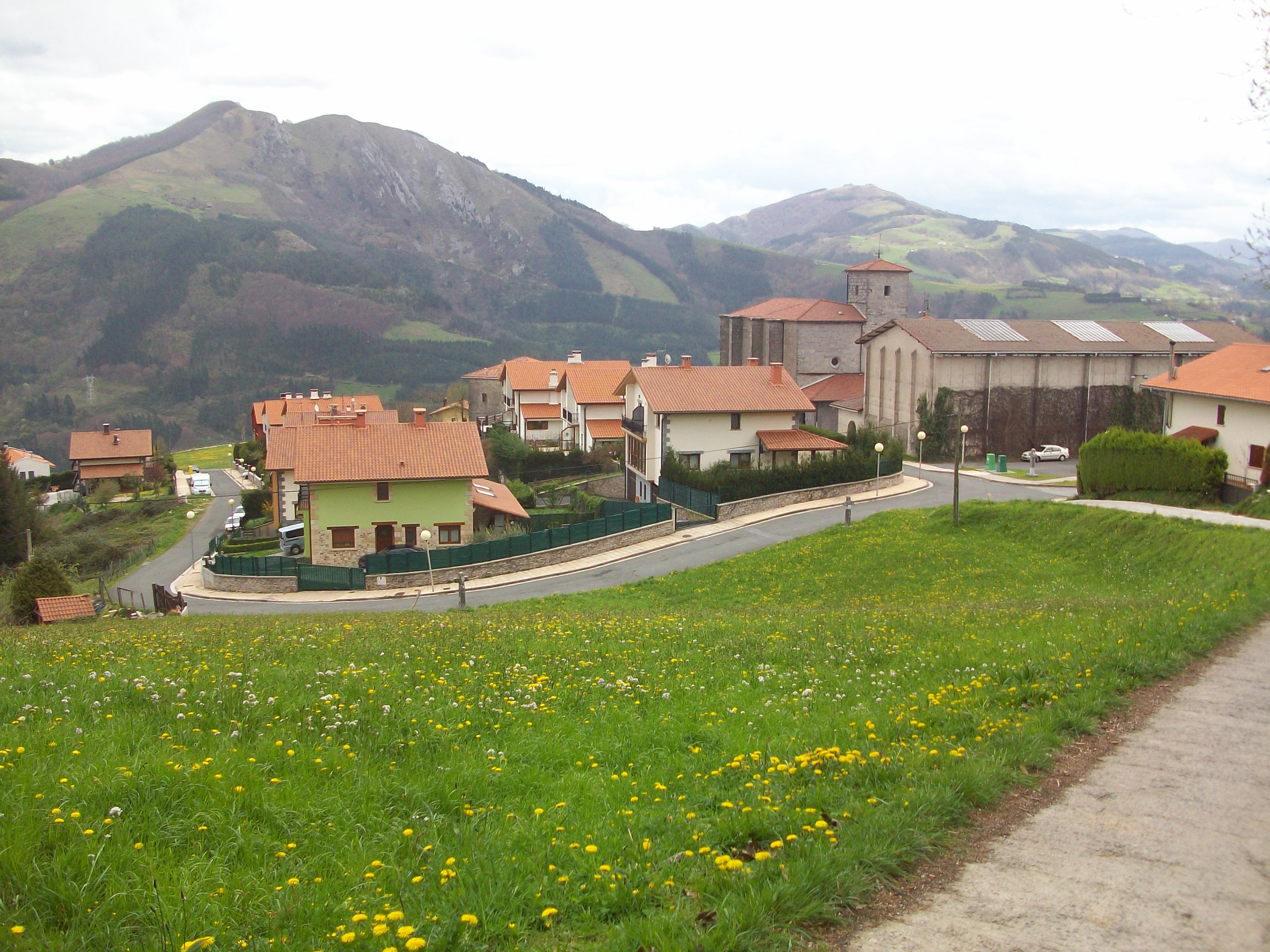
- View of Hernialde

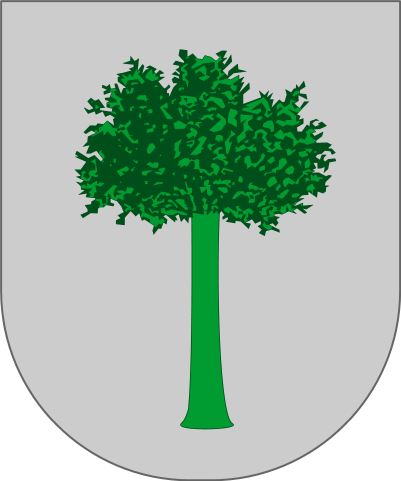
- Coat of arms

- Location of Hernialde within the Basque Country Location of Hernialde within Spain
- Coordinates: 43°9′16″N 2°5′7″W
- Country: Spain
- Autonomous community: Basque Country
- Province: Gipuzkoa
- Comarca: Tolosaldea

Area
  - Total: 4 km^{2} (1.5 sq mi)
- Elevation: 299 m (981 ft)

Population (2025-01-01)
  - Total: 326
  - Density: 82/km^{2} (210/sq mi)
- Time zone: UTC+1 (CET)
  - Summer (DST): UTC+2 (CEST)
- Postal code: 20494

Hernialde is a town located in the province of Gipuzkoa, in the autonomous community of Basque Country, northern Spain.
