= Leaburu =

Town in Gipuzkoa, Spain

- Municipality
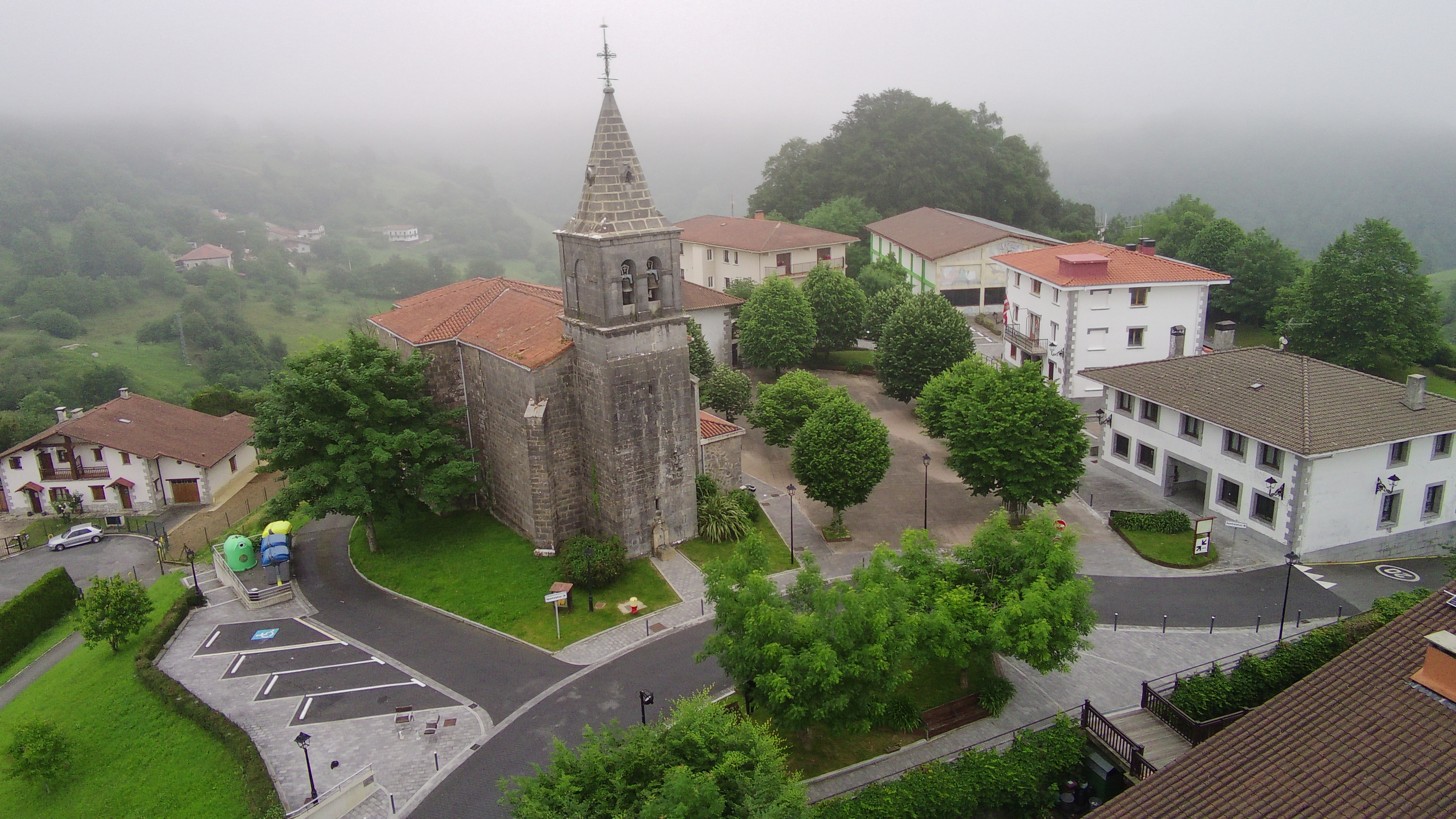

- Coat of arms

- Location of Leaburu within the Basque Country Location of Leaburu within Spain
- Coordinates: 43°07′25″N 2°03′0″W
- Country: Spain
- Autonomous community: Basque Country
- Province: Gipuzkoa
- Eskualde: Tolosaldea

Government
  - Mayor: Luixa Uzkudun Etxenagusia (EH Bildu)

Area
  - Total: 3.5 km^{2} (1.4 sq mi)

Population (2025-01-01)
  - Total: 390
  - Density: 110/km^{2} (290/sq mi)
- Demonym: Basque: leaburuar
- Time zone: UTC+1 (CET)
  - Summer (DST): UTC+2 (CEST)
- Official language(s): Basque; Spanish
- Website: Official website

Leaburu is a town located in the province of Gipuzkoa, in the Autonomous Community of Basque Country, northern Spain.
