= Baliarrain =

Coordinates: 43°04′10″N 2°07′42″W

- Coat of arms

- Location in Spain.
- Country: Spain
- Autonomous community: Gipuzkoa

Area
  - Total: 2.70 km^{2} (1.04 sq mi)
- Elevation: 296 m (971 ft)

Population (2025-01-01)
  - Total: 152
  - Density: 56.3/km^{2} (146/sq mi)
- Time zone: UTC+1 (CET)
  - Summer (DST): UTC+2 (CEST)

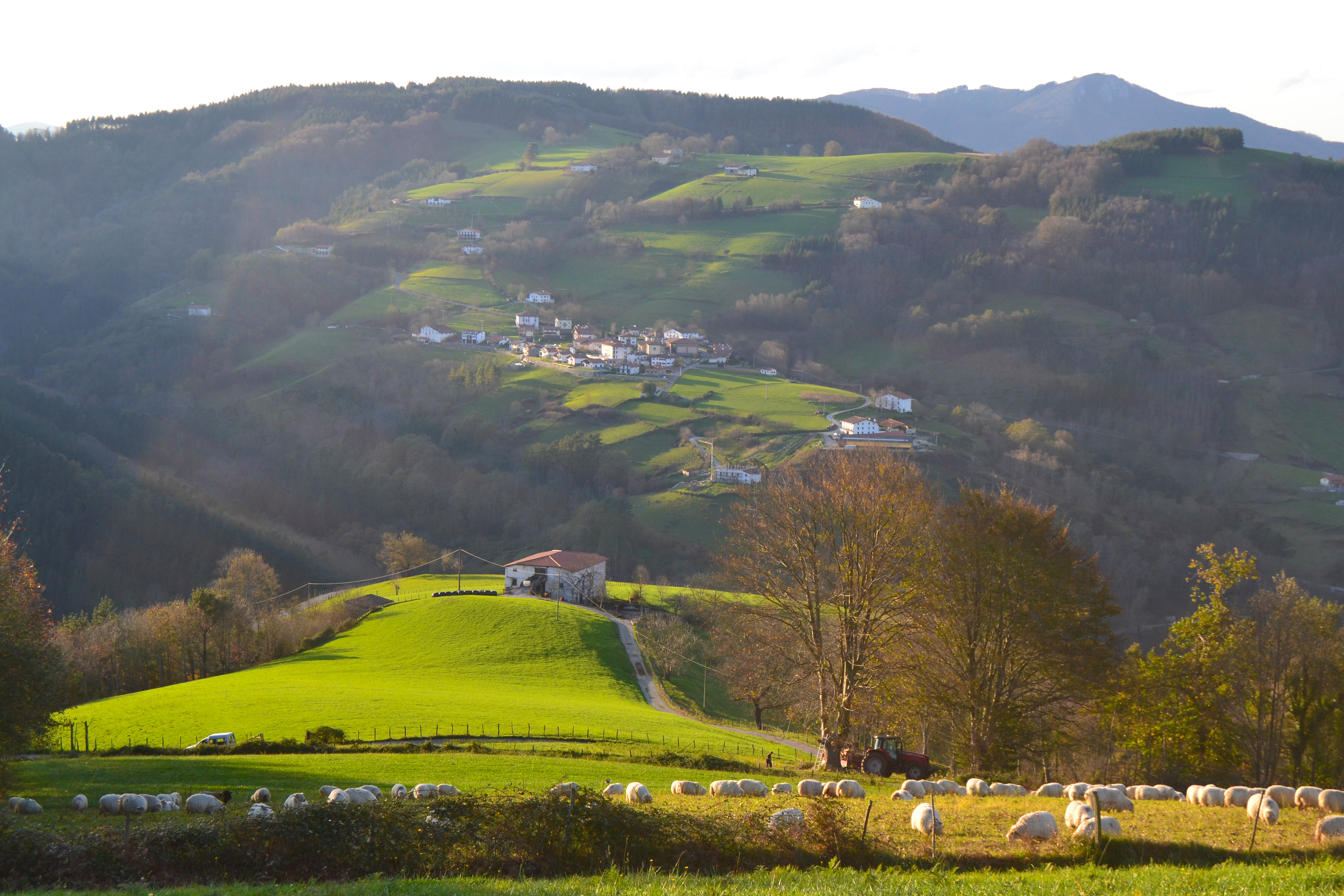

Baliarrain is a town located in the province of Gipuzkoa, in the autonomous community of Basque Country, in northern Spain.
