= Aduna =

- Municipality
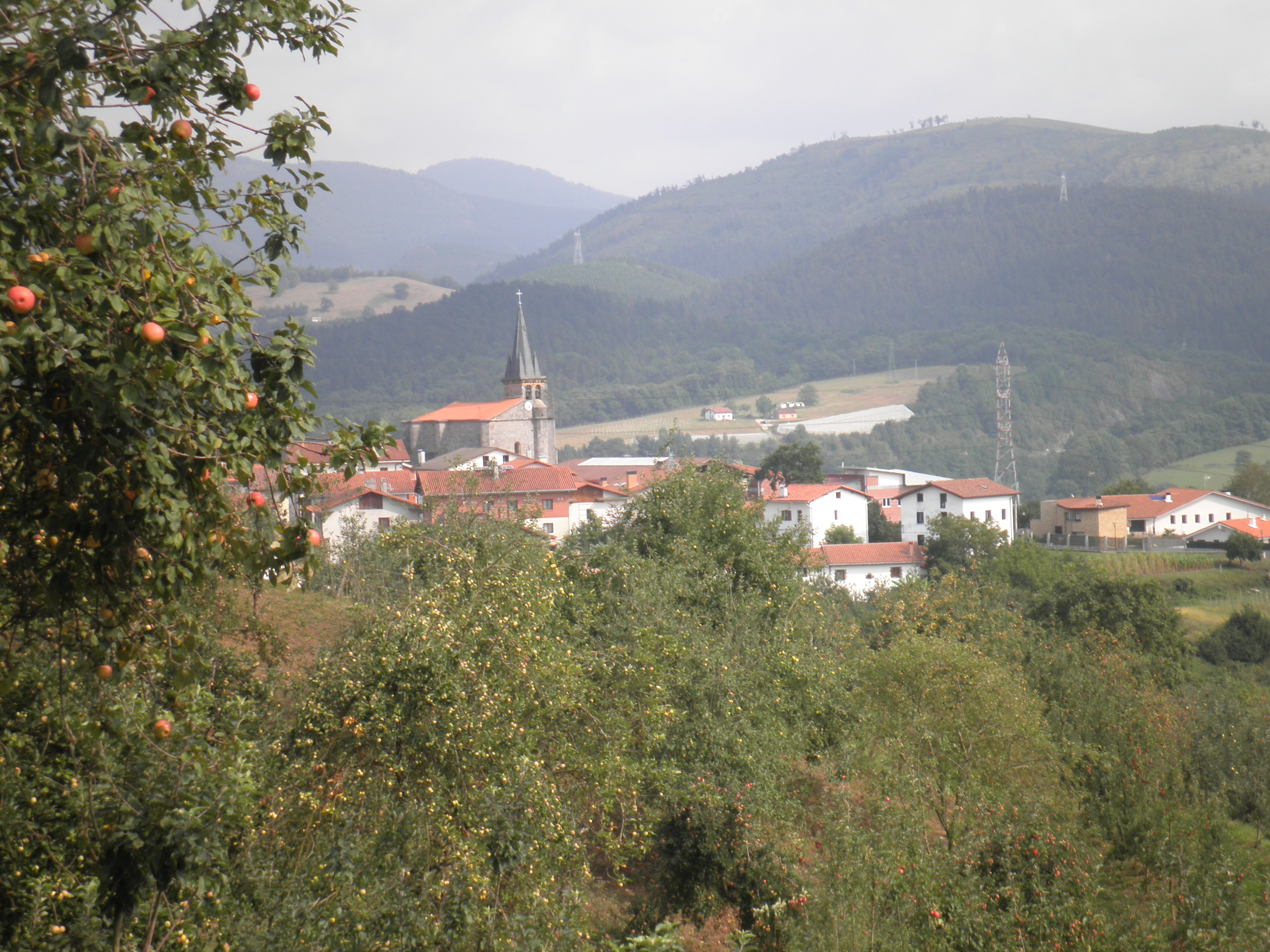
- Aduna

- Coat of arms

- Location of Aduna within the Basque Autonomous Community
- Coordinates: 43°12′N 2°3′W
- Country: Spain
- Autonomous community: Basque Country
- Province: Gipuzkoa
- Comarca: Tolosaldea

Population (2025-01-01)
  - Total: 500
- Time zone: UTC+1 (CET)
  - Summer (DST): UTC+2 (CEST)
- Postal code: 20150
- Dialing code: 34 (Spain) + 943 (Gipuzkoa)
- Website: Official website

Aduna is a town located in the province of Gipuzkoa, in the autonomous community of Basque Country, in the North of Spain. In 2003, Aduna had a total population of 341.

Aduna as a last name is likely to have a Basque origin, although none of the 341 inhabitants of the town of Aduna has that last name.
