= Irura =

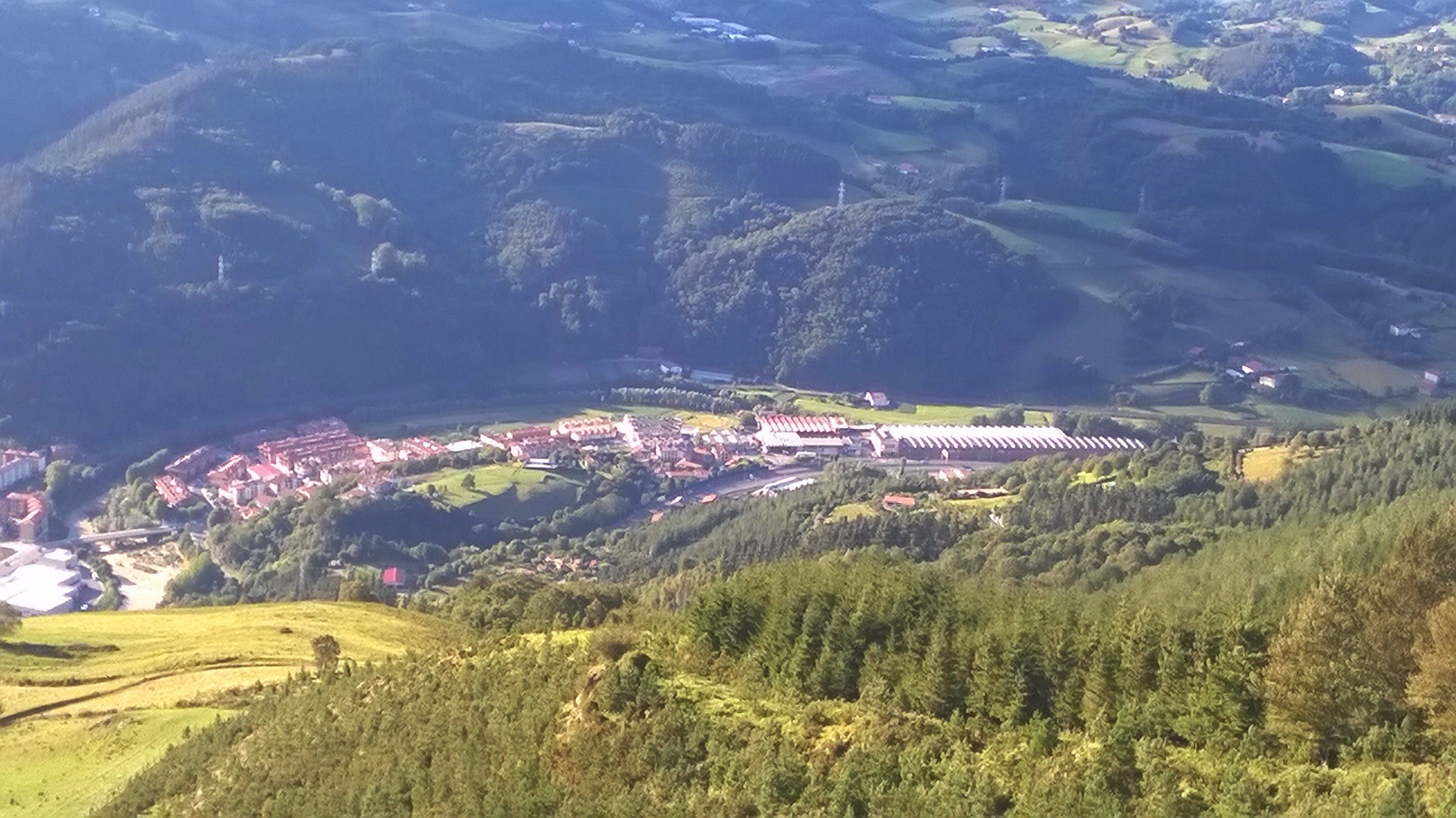
- View of Irura

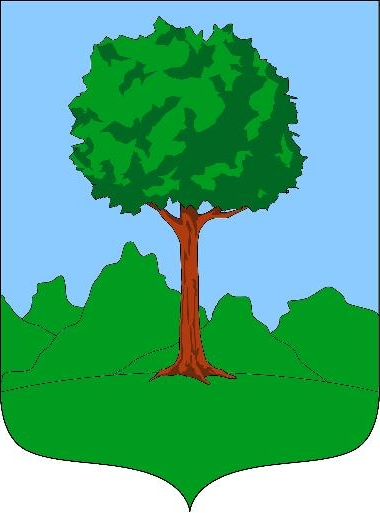
- Coat of arms

- Location of Irura within the Basque Country
- Coordinates: 43°10′03″N 2°04′02″W
- Country: Spain
- Autonomous community: Basque Country
- Province: Gipuzkoa
- Eskualdea: Tolosaldea

Government
  - Mayor: Ainhoa Ugalde Gorostiaga

Area
  - Total: 2.99 km^{2} (1.15 sq mi)
- Elevation: 65 m (213 ft)

Population (2025-01-01)
  - Total: 1,885
  - Density: 630/km^{2} (1,630/sq mi)
- Time zone: UTC+1 (CET)
  - Summer (DST): UTC+2 (CEST)
- Postal code: 20271
- Website: www.irura.eus

Irura is a town located in the province of Gipuzkoa, in the autonomous community of Basque Country, northern Spain.
