= Albiztur =

Coordinates: 43°07′46″N 2°08′14″W

- Coat of arms

- Location in Spain.
- Country: Spain
- Autonomous community: Gipuzkoa

Area
  - Total: 13.09 km^{2} (5.05 sq mi)

Population (2025-01-01)
  - Total: 328
  - Density: 25.1/km^{2} (64.9/sq mi)
- Time zone: UTC+1 (CET)
  - Summer (DST): UTC+2 (CEST)
- Website: www.albiztur.com

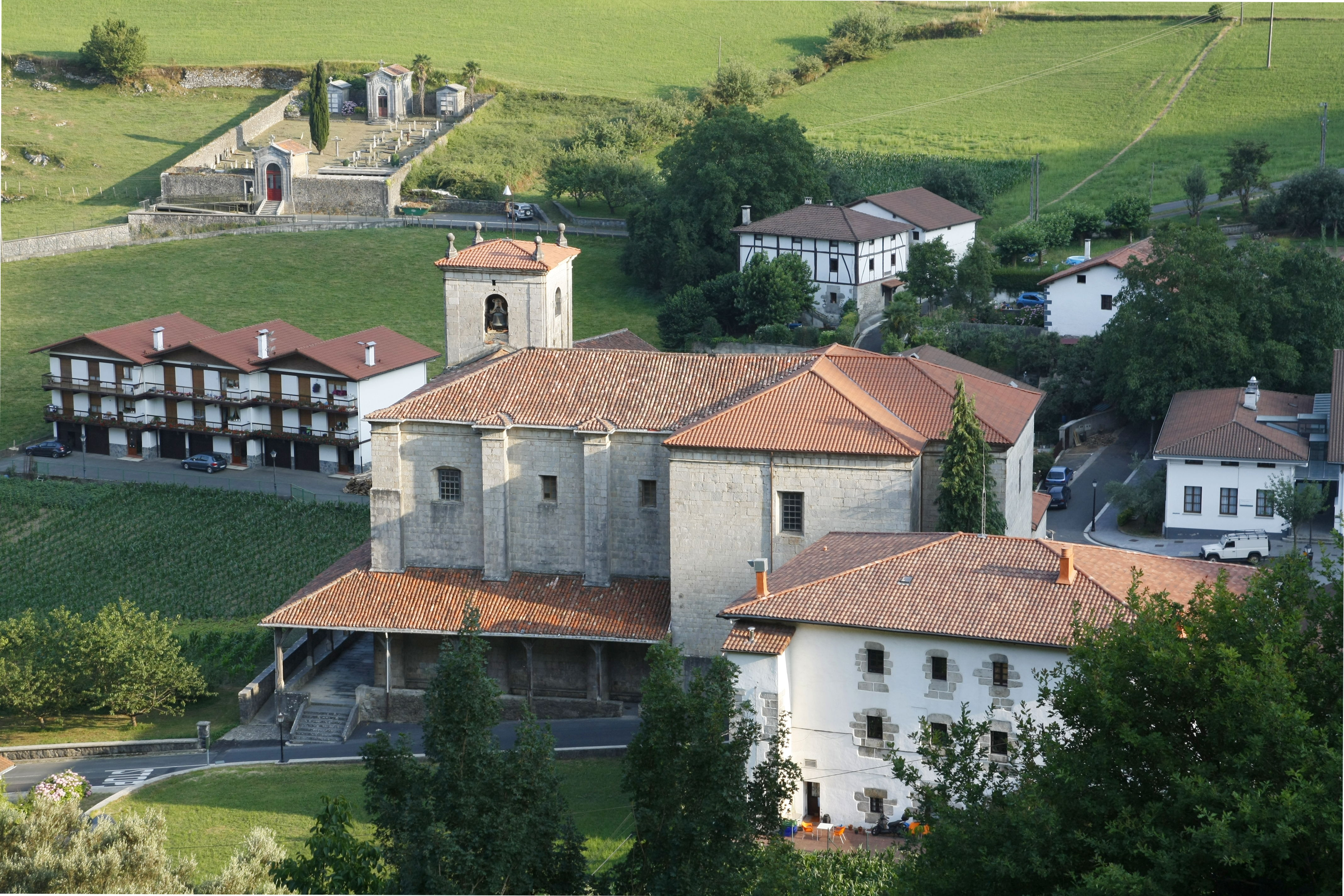
Church of Our Lady of the Assumption in Albiztur

Albiztur is a town located in the province of Gipuzkoa, in the autonomous community of Basque Country, in the north of Spain. In 2014 Albiztur had a total population of 327.
