= Gaztelu =

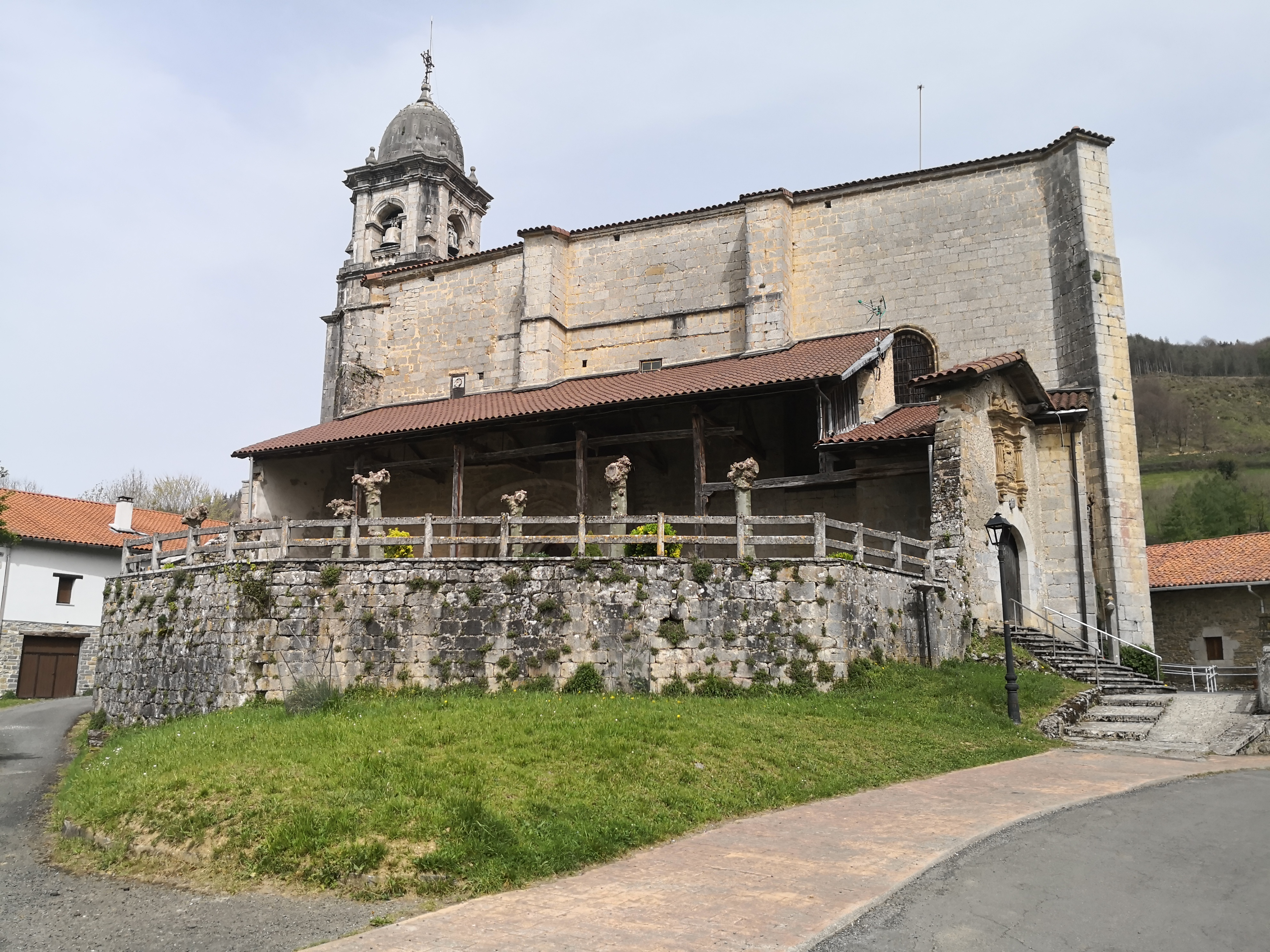

- Location of Gaztelu within the Basque Country Gaztelu (Spain)
- Coordinates: 43°6′59″N 2°1′22″W
- Country: Spain
- Autonomous community: Gipuzkoa

Area
  - Total: 9.15 km^{2} (3.53 sq mi)

Population (2025-01-01)
  - Total: 171
  - Density: 18.7/km^{2} (48.4/sq mi)
- Time zone: UTC+1 (CET)
  - Summer (DST): UTC+2 (CEST)

Gaztelu is a village and municipality located in the province of Gipuzkoa, in the autonomous community of Basque Country, northern Spain.
