= Ibarra, Spain =

Coordinates: 43°7′51″N 2°03′42″W

Ibarra
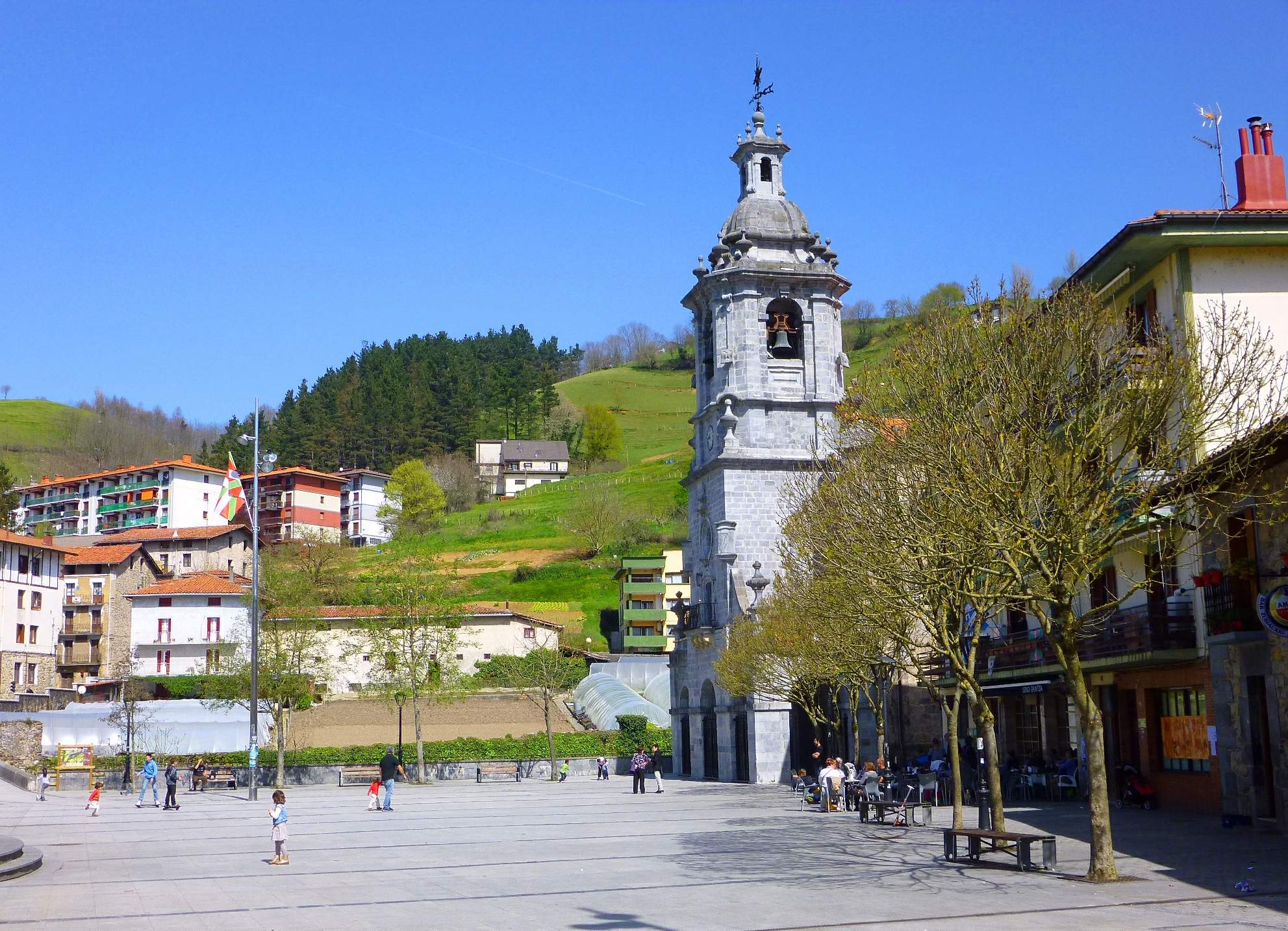
- View of Ibarra

- Coat of arms

- Location in Spain.
- Country: Spain
- Autonomous community: Gipuzkoa

Area
  - Total: 5.03 km^{2} (1.94 sq mi)
- Elevation: 75 m (246 ft)

Population (2025-01-01)
  - Total: 4,114
  - Density: 818/km^{2} (2,120/sq mi)
- Time zone: UTC+1 (CET)
  - Summer (DST): UTC+2 (CEST)
- Website: www.ibarra.eus

Ibarra is a town and municipality located in the province of Gipuzkoa, in the autonomous community of Basque Country, northern Spain. By 2003 INE figures Ibarra had a total population of 4,374.
