= Belauntza =

Coordinates: 43°8′6″N 2°3′1″W

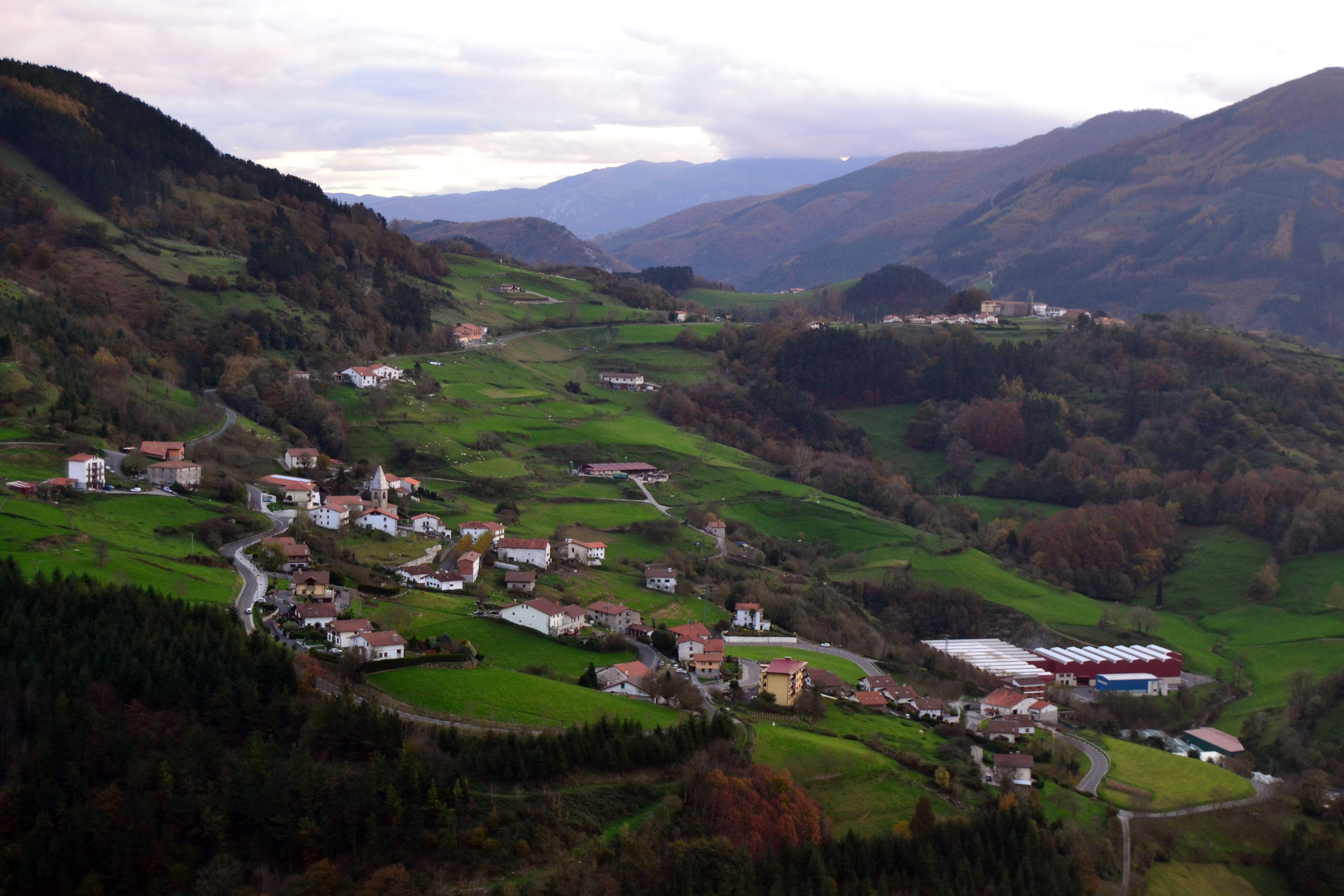
- View of Belauntza, Basque Country

- Location in Spain.
- Country: Spain
- Autonomous community: Gipuzkoa

Government
  - Mayor: Iñaki Telleria Bengoetxea

Area
  - Total: 3.43 km^{2} (1.32 sq mi)

Population (2025-01-01)
  - Total: 291
  - Density: 84.8/km^{2} (220/sq mi)
- Time zone: UTC+1 (CET)
  - Summer (DST): UTC+2 (CEST)

Belauntza (Spanish: Belaunza) is a town located in the province of Gipuzkoa, in the autonomous community of Basque Country, northern Spain.
