= Ernani (disambiguation) =

Ernani is an opera by Giuseppe Verdi that debuted in 1844, based on the play Hernani by Victor Hugo.

Ernani may also refer to:

== People ==
- Ernani Braga (1888-1948), Brazilian composer, pianist and conductor
- Ernani Bernardi (1911-2006), American big-band musician and politician
- Ernani Cuenco (1936-1988), Filipino composer, music director and music teacher
- Ernâni Lopes (1942-2010), Portuguese economist and politician
- Ernani Aguiar (born 1950), Brazilian composer and musicologist
- Ernani Pereira (born 1978), Azerbaijani football defender
- Ernani (footballer) (born 1982), Ernani do Nascimento Germano, Brazilian football left-back
- Ernani (Mozambican footballer) (born 1998), Ernan Alberto Siluane, Mozambican football goalkeeper

== Other uses ==
- Ernani (1903 recording), a 1903 recording of the eponymous opera by the Italian Gramophone Company
- Ernani José Machado Lake, an artificial lake in Lucas do Rio Verde, Brazil

== See also ==
- Hernani (disambiguation)
