= San Adrian (tunnel) =

Cave in the Basque Country, Spain

San Adrian tunnel
- Lizarrate (Basque); Túnel de San Adrián (Spanish)
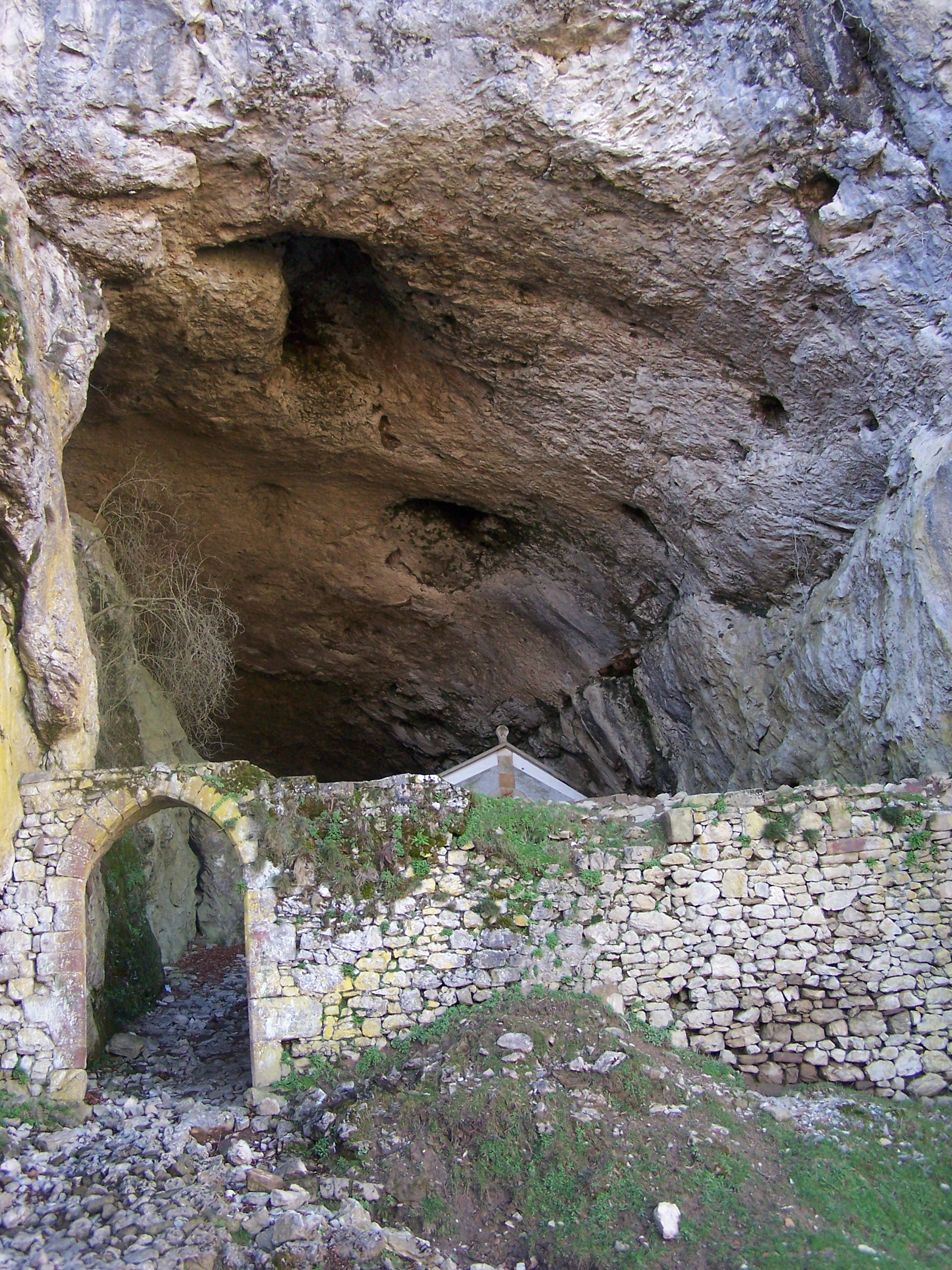
- Northern access to the San Adrian tunnel

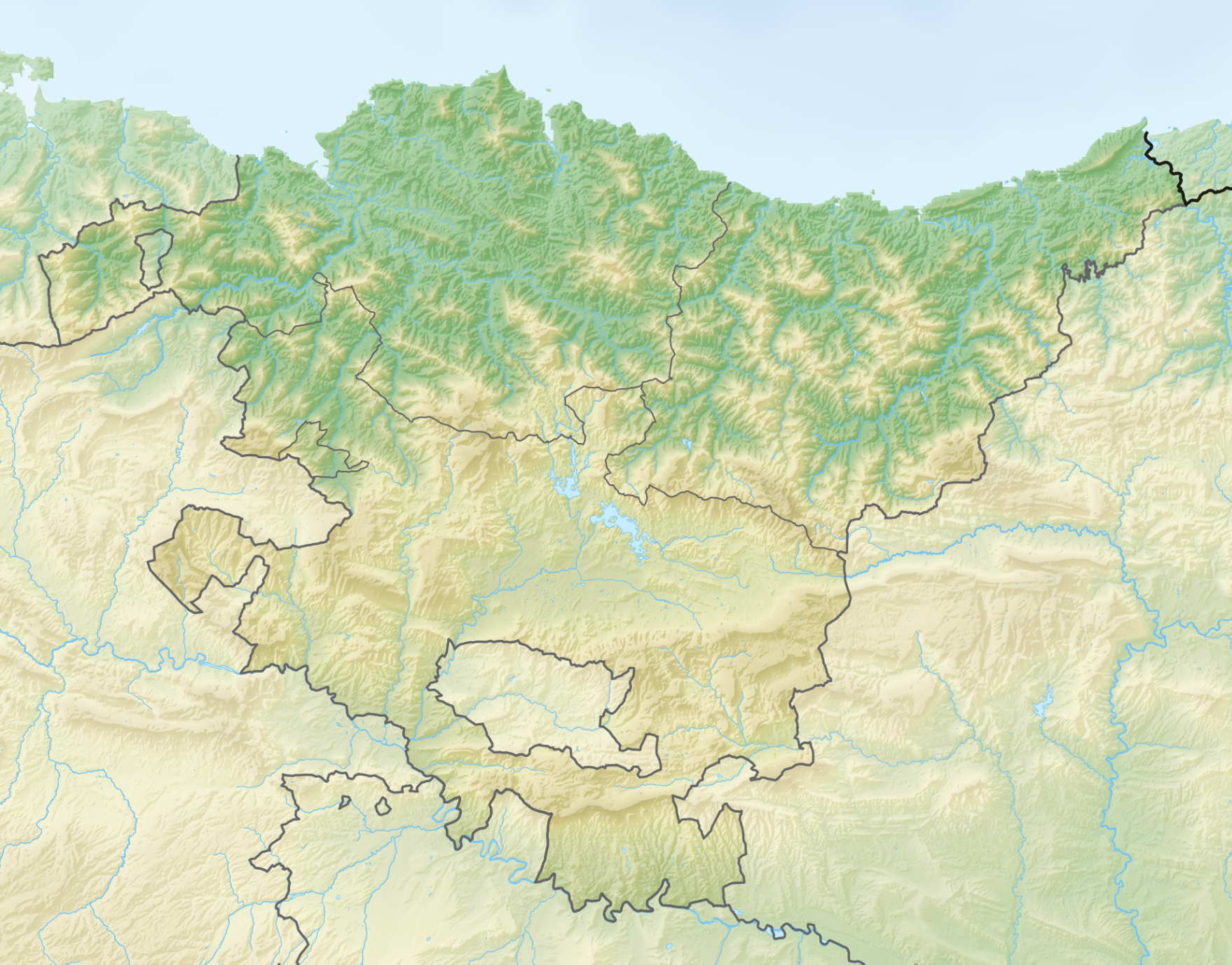
- Location within the Basque Country Location within Spain
- Location: Aizkorri-Aratz Natural Park, Gipuzkoa, Basque Country, Spain
- Coordinates: 42°56′07″N 2°18′55″W
- Entrances: 2

UNESCO World Heritage Site
- Type: Cultural
- Criteria: ii, iv, vi
- Designated: 2015
- Part of: Routes of Santiago de Compostela: Camino Francés and Routes of Northern Spain
- Reference no.: 669bis-017
- Region: Europe and North America

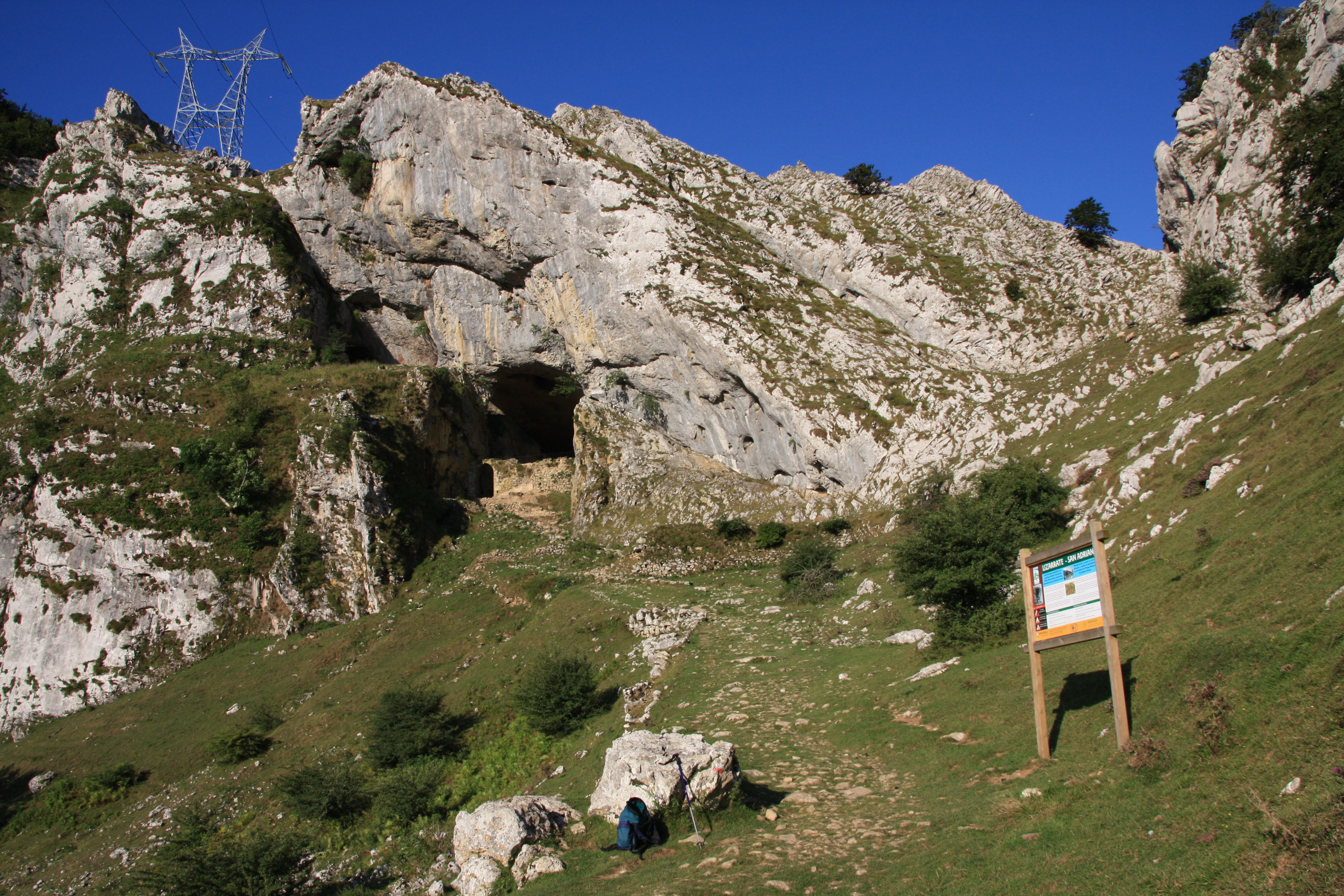
Path to the northern access

The San Adrian tunnel or Lizarrate is a natural cave carved by water erosion in the rock (called Lizarrate, arguably stemming from "leize arrate", 'the stone gate of the cave') with an opening on either side north and south; it also holds a hermitage inside. The tunnel provides a natural passage dividing the provinces of Gipuzkoa and Álava/Araba (the actual borderline locating at the Alto de la Horca). It is a point of interest on the Basque pilgrimage route of the Way of St. James.

The Spanish-Basque linguistic boundary of the twentieth century was established in this area, the next village south, Zalduondo, having been predominantly Spanish speaking during that period. Nowadays many hikers cross the tunnel in order to gain access to the nearby peaks, forests and grazing fields, namely Aratz, Aizkorri and Urbia.

== Name ==
As so many times in Basque place- and person-names, this name of worship (San Adrian) has undergone a mutation arguably brought about by scribes and travelers with no knowledge of Basque. The pass itself is attested as Leizarrate at the beginning of the 17th century, while nowadays this naming (in the modern form Lizarrate) is usually limited to the rock in Spanish, with Basque still retaining the name Lizarrate also with its original meaning – i.e. referring to the tunnel.

Originally the hermitage was dedicated to the "Sancta Trinitate" or Holy Trinity. Yet the word, like many Romance and Latin words, was adapted to Basque by undergoing a reduction along the phonetic rules, described by K. Mitxelena, that ultimately resulted in Sandrati or Sandratei, as locals call it. Other phonetic outputs as attested in place-names close to the area include Sandrati, Santa Tria and variations, especially in the lands of Álava/Araba extending south of the mountain range, e.g. Santa Tria (village Audikana), San Tetria (village Contrasta 1556, leftover place-name of a former hermitage otherwise called in Romance San Adrian).

Saint Adrian does not hold a representative position among Basque religious icons, as opposed to the ubiquitous San Martin, San Miguel or San Juan/Donibane, but Saint Adrian was actually much revered in the ways of St James. The name San Adrian thus results from a phonetic interpretation by Romance-speaking people of the Basque name for "Sancta Trinitate". Locals still gather in a celebration on the Trinity Day or following Sunday on a yearly basis.

== History ==
The occurrence and relevance of the tunnel is attested since the 16th century, more so since the 13th, when historic circumstances rendered it a preferred route for pilgrimage and trade. The status increasingly gained at that time by the San Adrian pass and the way coming south from Gascony down into Gipuzkoa was to have an important impact on the social, economic and constructing development of the population nuclei located on and around it. This branch of the Way of St. James became less popular for trade and pilgrimage than the more convenient French Way, via Orreaga. It is a point of interest on the historic Basque pilgrimage route of the Way of St. James.

=== Prehistory ===
The mountain pass was used for ages by shepherds, as evidenced by prehistoric traces of seasonal cattle migration, dolmens and burial mounds (usually small) in the area. Cattle, especially sheep, keep on grazing up to these days on the steep pastures all around the area of the cave. Place-names associated to alien cultures, such as neighbouring town Zegama or Arakama (commonplace family name in this region), claimed by some scholars to stem from Indo-European, suggest that European peoples may have used this pass.

=== Antiquity and Early Middle Ages ===
In step with the popular name, the "Roman way" (also called by locals estratea [es̺ˈtɾatea]), some point to the construction of the original roadway by the Romans, with continuous upkeep and renovation in the Middle Ages. At any rate, this stretch is not located on the important axis Bordeaux-Astorga cutting its way east to west through the Alava plains (merging point with the Tunnel Route in Salvatierra/Agurain). A Roman inscription has been found in Zegama (only two sites discovered so far in Gipuzkoa, the other one locating in the ancient Oiasso). A reference of the hermitage and pass of San Adrian in the blurred early ages is provided in Noticias Históricas (by J.A. Llorente), where the spot is identified (reasonably so, see Name) as the "Sanctam Trianam" landmark cited as establishing the southern boundaries of the bishopric of Bayonne. Early Medieval Navarrese and Castilian coins and copper buckles have been gathered in the tunnel, confirming that it was frequented in advance of the 13th century. The coastal route was dangerous on account of Viking attacks and raids, while the southern roads, namely the French Way crossing Pamplona/Iruñea, Logroño and on to Burgos was subject to Muslim forays and attacks, which rendered the Alavan lands (and therefore the San Adrian tunnel route) safer and more secure, as "they have always stayed in possession of its inhabitants".

=== Late Middle Ages ===
After snatching the territories of Alava and Gipuzkoa from Navarre, Alfonso X encouraged the use of this stretch that connected by land Castile to Gascony through the strip extending from San Sebastian to Irun. With a view to strengthening both trade and military grip in the region, the king founded in 1256 the towns of Salvatierra (Agurain), Segura and Villafranca (Ordizia) in various spots of the way, so becoming popular with pilgrims, that could find there shelter and safety.

=== Modern times ===
Despite pilgrimage shift to the flatter, safer and more convenient French Way, the San Adrian tunnel road kept its profile and was much in use as a European route in the 15th, 16th and 17th century; it is worth remembering that the former was in Navarrese territory (definite Castilian conquest of Navarre in 1521), so Castilian kings continued to foster the tunnel route. At this period, evidence and descriptions about the route given by pilgrims and other users coming from Europe grow more frequent.

The San Adrian mount and pass are "rugged and difficult for horses", comments the cartographer Jan Janssonius in his Novus Atlas. "The passengers usually carve their names on the thick stones or the rocks, so there are recorded many names with the date of the year they crossed the roughness of these mountains", he adds. In approx. 1567, Jorge Braun conjures up the inside of the tunnel: the nice inn and the good suppers offered to the pilgrims, especially to those who brought money along, and the fodder supplied to horses, no matter if the travellers were devoid of money. In 1572, J.B. Venturino travelled in the retinue of the patriarch of Alexandria, who crossed the tunnel northwards. The cavern "is dark and frightening", observes, but there he also mentions the hermitage and the house of the governor, responsible for watching the pass, as havens of preaching and safety guarantee for travellers. According to tradition, king Enrique IV of Castile (ruling 1454–1474) and later sister and queen Isabel I of Castile crossed the tunnel. Legend has it, on his route from Germany to Spain emperor Charles V first dismounted from the horse at this cave.

Since the Middle Ages the tunnel has been a point where tolls are paid on account of its border position. Yet usually at night, when the gate was shut, smugglers skip the tunnel by mounting up the rock North of the tunnel through a very narrow path called Ochoa Arrate. At the time, highwaymen frequenting the area were dreaded by pilgrims and travellers, who were not acquainted with the wild surroundings where local bandits could easily stalk and find a hideout. The care provided inside the tunnel is welcome. Many remember in their travel memoirs the cosy atmosphere found at the inn, the pilgrims singing and the "fat woman" serving them. Above the North entrance of the tunnel, the fortress watches and protects the pass, a building that may hold 100 soldiers, as reported by a traveller in the 17th century. Much appreciated water sprung out of the stone wall in the tunnel, as told by a Franciscan in 1633.

Meanwhile, other routes grow gradually more important at the expense of the stretch corresponding to the San Adrian tunnel. "The San Adrian pass is good only for people on horse or on foot, since the carriage way exiting Vitoria goes through Salinas, Mondragon, Oñate and Villareal [from Gipuzkoa]", explains the arguably French Basque traveller J.C. Santoyo in 1612. However, this stretch continues to be widely used up to the late 18th century, when the new King's Highway from Madrid to France is built in 1765 and traffic shifts, so spurring the definite decay of the San Adrian tunnel way.

== Surroundings ==
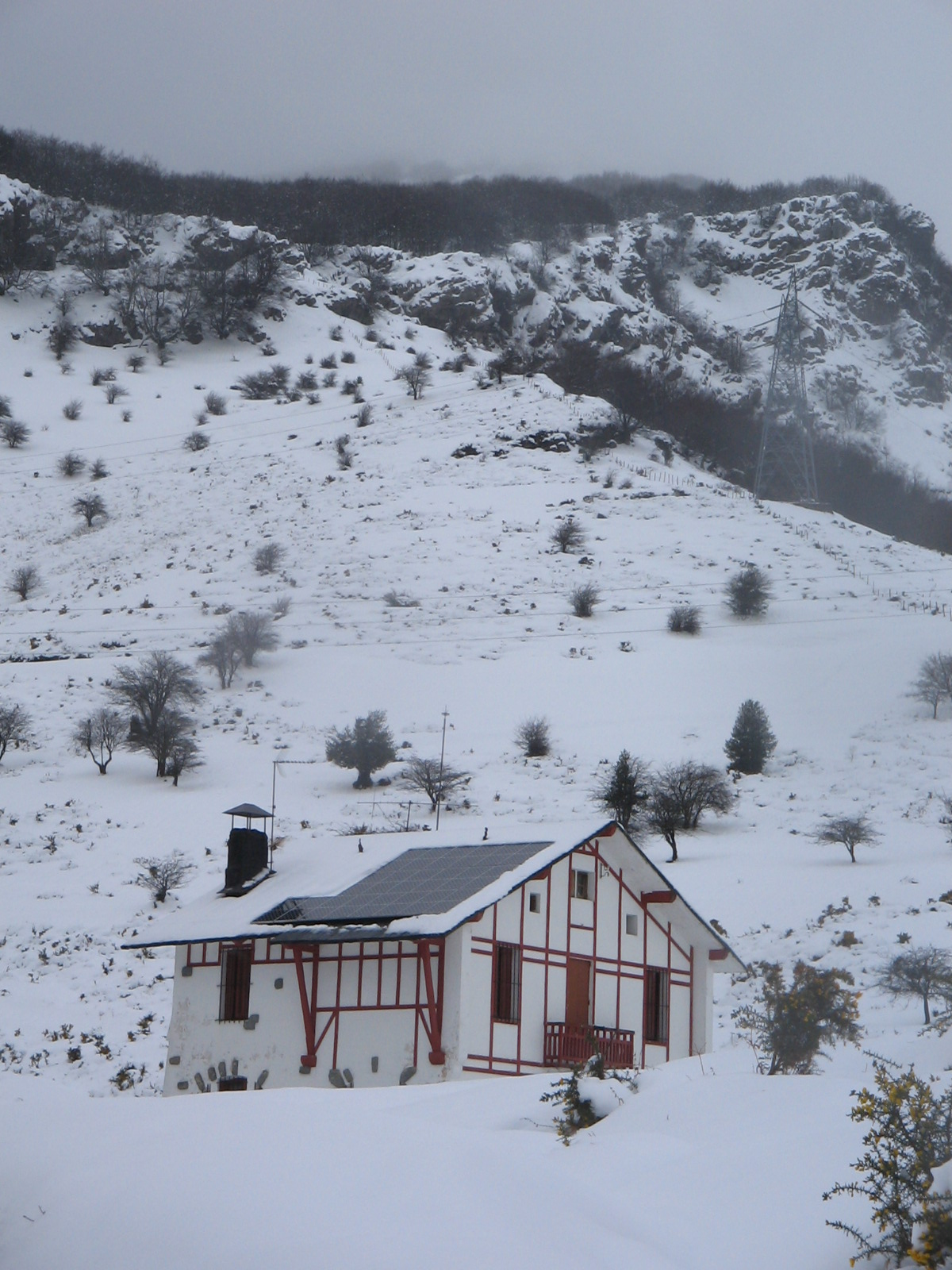
The Basque Mountain Federation's refuge

The cave rises at 1,005 m high and it stands in the lowest point between the towering massifs of Aizkorri and Aratz mounts (1,528 m and 1,442 m respectively). Vast beech forests covered with bucolic brown in autumn abound in the area north and south of the cave, with limestone rocks cropping up more frequently as we gain altitude and approach the cave from the north. The most usual access points for hikers are:

- In the Gipuzkoan side: the hamlet of Otzaurte (652 m). A concrete track starting off from the main paved road (Zegama-Altsasu, GI-2637) heads south. This line splits the waters that slide to the Mediterranean through the Ebro watershed and those flowing north to the Atlantic through the Oria River. The track winds up the beech forest. Hikers may follow the red and white GR signs leading to paths that alternately detach from and merge into the main concrete track. After a while, the Beunda/e pass looks out into a wild valley (20'), the track heading west down the slope. In the landmark Aldaola (50'), a track heads up west, while vehicles should follow the left track sloping down. Going west, in a few metres a steep wet slope lies left out of the main track (red and white GR signs) until it joins a wide track near the refuge (1h5). From there, an overt view of the San Adrian tunnel could be seen, while the easily noticeable gentle path ascends west to the cave, merging with the St James roadway of cobblestone layout coming from Zegama (1h20). On choosing the left track down (vehicles), in a couple of minutes the stream is reached and crossed to the other side, where vehicles could park at a sharp bend (see map); hikers may ascend north through a narrow path making its way out of the forest towards the refuge.
- In the Alavan side: the carpark (dead end) of Zumarraundi (Zalduondo). A patchwork of paths sloping up north among beech trees penetrates in the dense forest. Traces of the medieval roadway may be easily noticed winding up (20') to the highest point of the mountain pass, the Alto de la Horca, named after the gibbet formerly set up there (35'). Sloping down a hollow, the medieval track leads north past the spring of Ezkaratza on the right (45'), until the tunnel is attained (55').

Pilgrims coming south from Zegama take the pilgrimage way, which follows a paved road first (Zegama-Altsasu, GI-2637) and splits away through a concrete track that ascends on the right (signs all the way, see Graphic description of the Segura-Salvatierra/Agurain stretch). On nearing the San Adrian tunnel, the hut shaped Sancti Spiritus hermitage stands right on the left of the way. It is often claimed that it may have belonged to the Templar Knights, while this association remains contentious.
