= El Marquesado Wind Farm =

Wind farm in Granada, Spain

El Marquesado Wind Farm has a capacity of 198 megawatts (MW) and is Spain's second largest wind farm, located in Granada. With an annual output of 450 gigawatt hours, the El Marquesado complex encompasses four wind farms, each with a capacity of 49.5 MW. All four sites use Gamesa 2 MW turbines. The facility cost some EUR 250 million (US $375 million) to develop.

== See also ==
- Wind power in Spain
- Elgea-Urkilla eolic park
