= Aratz =

Mountain in the Basque Country, Spain

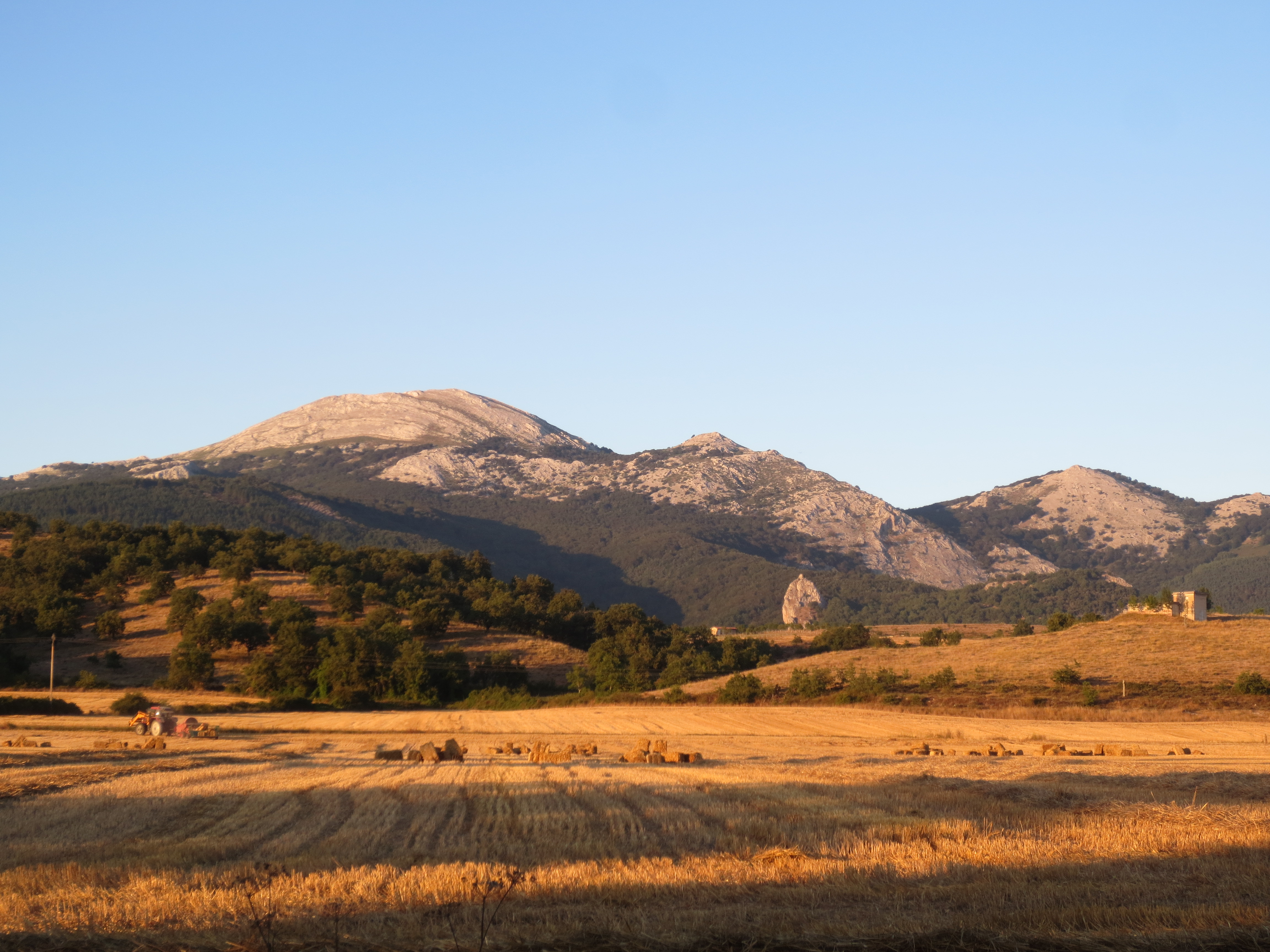
- Aratz seen from Zalduondo

Highest point
- Elevation: 1,445 m (4,741 ft)
- Prominence: 276 m (906 ft)
- Coordinates: 42°55′19″N 2°18′13″W

Naming
- Language of name: Basque
- Pronunciation: Basque: [aɾats̻]

Geography
- Parent range: Altzania

Climbing
- Easiest route: Hike

Aratz is a mountain of the Basque Country in Spain. It is the highest mountain of the Altzania mountain range that is itself a continuation of the Aizkorri massif. It lies in the province of Álava, close to the border with Gipuzkoa. The summit rises to 1,445 metres (4,741 ft), next to the secondary summit of Elurzuloak. The whole area has been part of the Aizkorri-Aratz Natural Park since 2006.

A sculpture by Nestor Basterretxea was placed at the summit in 1997 and disappeared in 2001. It was found in 2021 and subsequently re-erected in Araia.

== Access points and trails ==
The main access points are located both in the town of Araia on the fringes of the Alava plains (840 m drop from the summit) and at the spring Ezkaratza (drinking water) by the Way of St James west of the San Adrian tunnel.

- The route starting off in Araia (PR-A11) heads north past the ruins of the fortress Marutegi on a rock halfway (8th century). Soon after, the trail with yellow and white signalization must be abandoned right to get to the spring Iturriotz (1h10, drinking water), and on to the switching point with both GR-121 and PR-A12 coming from Ezkaratza. The summit of Aratz lies on the south-east after surmounting steep limestone karst slopes with no clear trail (1h45).
- From Ezkaratza, some minutes away from the pass of San Adrian, the PR-A12 circuit trail penetrates south-east up into the forest until it merges with GR-121 (red and white signalization) and the above route coming from Araia.
- A third but less popular route sets off in Beunda on the way to San Adrian. The concrete track winds down west until the milestone Aldaola where it forks (altitude 850 m). The option is to follow the left track, which going down reaches and crosses the stream. At this point, the northern face of Aratz towers on the left covered with a vast beech forest. In no more than 150 metres, the track veers sharply to the east and on to south-east until the pass of Allarte (1,141 m high) is reached.
