= Zegama =

Zegama Cegama
- Municipality
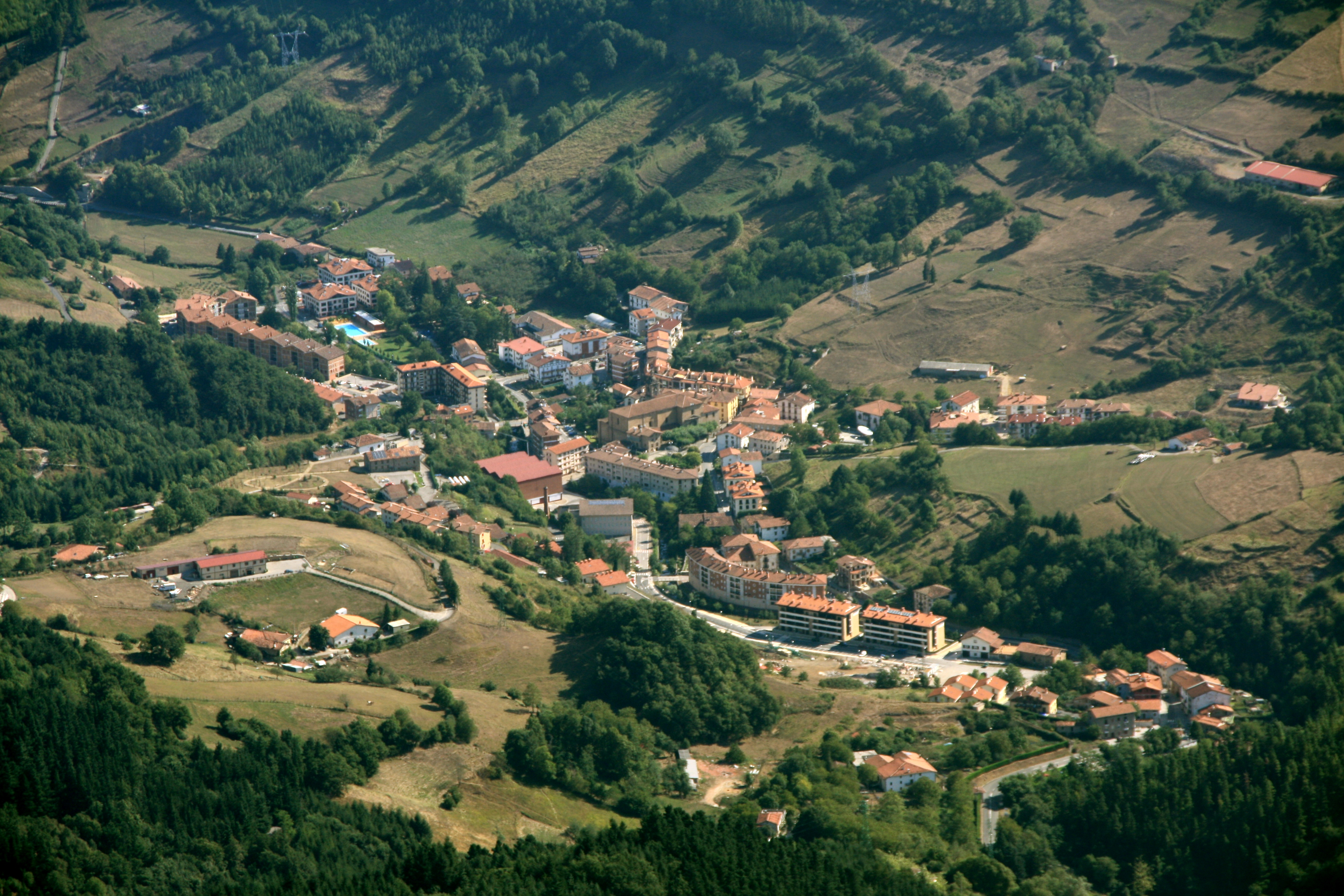
- View of Zegama from Aizkorri

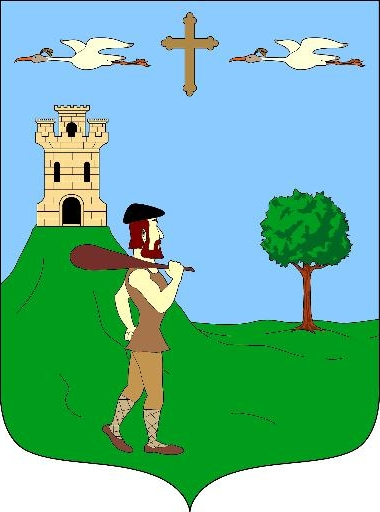
- Coat of arms

- Location in Spain
- Coordinates: 42°58′36″N 2°17′27″W
- Country: Spain
- Autonomous community: Basque Country
- Province: Gipuzkoa
- Eskualdea: Goierri

Government
  - Mayor: Iker Zubeldia (EH Bildu)

Area
  - Total: 35.07 km^{2} (13.54 sq mi)

Population (2025-01-01)
  - Total: 1,543
  - Density: 44.00/km^{2} (114.0/sq mi)
- Demonym: Zegamar
- Time zone: UTC+1 (CET)
  - Summer (DST): UTC+2 (CEST)
- Postal code: 20215
- Official language(s): Basque, Spanish
- Website: Official website

Zegama, popularly known as "the shadow of Aizkorri", is a town and municipality in the Goierri region of the province of Gipuzkoa, in the autonomous community of the Basque Country, northern Spain.

== Nature and culture ==
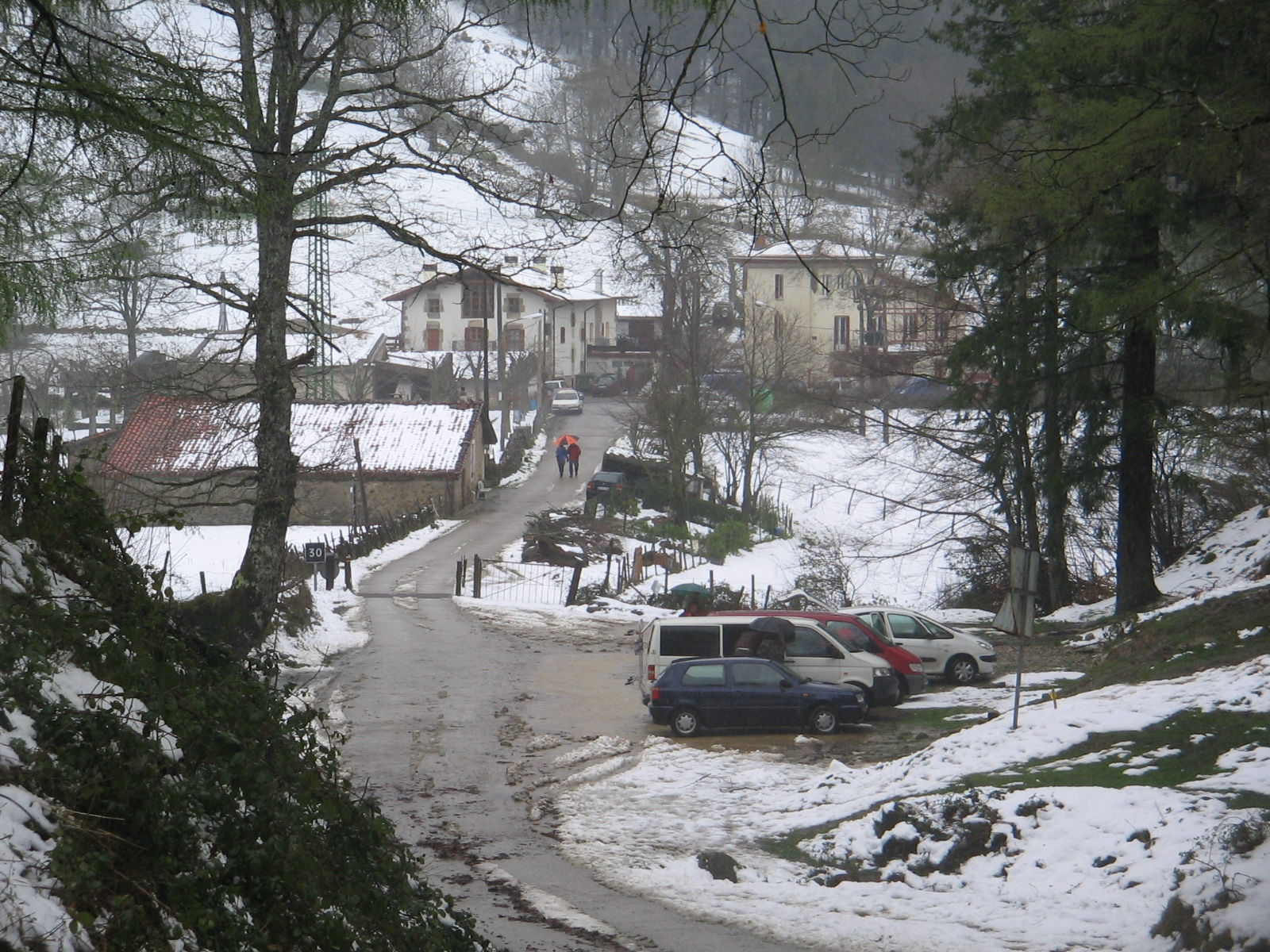
Otzaurte right on the dividing line between major watersheds

Zegama's main characteristic is its natural location as the last Gipuzkoan town up the valley of river Oria, very close to the Aizkorri-Aratz Natural Park, in which the highest mountain in the Basque Autonomous Community can be found, the popular Aizkorri summit (1,528 m), located at the same name mountain range towering over the whole area. The Oria River, the longest one in the province of Gipuzkoa, rises in several springs and their corresponding streams flowing down the dramatic slopes of the valley that merge in a main stream before the nucleus of the town. The southern Otzaurte hamlet (IPA: /o'tsaurte/) stands on the dividing line of the waters running onto the Mediterranean watershed and those flowing north to the Atlantic through the Oria river.

The historic Way of St James, namely the stretch called the Tunnel Route, passes through the town, the municipality and the Park since the Middle Ages. Pilgrims exit the town heading south up the slopes, so reaching the San Adrian tunnel after 5 km, where backpackers and hikers may gain access to the plains of Alava, the Urbia fields or the summits of the rugged Aizkorri mountain range.

== Climate ==
The climate in Zegama is typical of the eastern Cantabrian area, temperate and humid, with an average temperature of around 12 °C. There are around 180 rainy days a year. Autumn can be quite windy.

== Economy ==
The main economic activities are those related to industry, but agriculture does still exist. Cattle, especially sheep, graze on the sides of the mountainous terrain, following a tradition of millennia, as attested by old traces and megalithic vestiges that bear witness to the activity. The grazing provides the basis for the production of the much appreciated and highly regarded Idiazabal cheese elaborated and labelled as such on the whole Aizkorri-Aratz area and the Basque Mountains.

== Sports ==
The most important event that takes place in Zegama every year is the Zegama-Aizkorri Alpine Marathon, part of the Skyrunner World Series , which is the alpine marathon world championship.

== Notables of Zegama ==
- Joxe Azurmendi, philosopher
- Joxantonio Ormazabal, writer
