= Elgea-Urkilla eolic park =

Coordinates: 42.9576°N 2.4289°W

Elgea-Urkilla eolic park is a wind farm in Spain which was authorized to be built on 23 August 1999 by the union of Iberdrola Ente Vasco and Sociedad de Eolicas de Euskadi, S.A. Its construction took 6 months and it is situated between Alava and Gipuzkoa, powering villages such as Barrundia, San Millan, Eskoriatza and Aretxabaleta. The park also reaches the limits of the Aizkorri-Aratz Natural Park. It fills 7 hectares (17 acres), with 40 towers, twenty-seven of which are in Alava. The park's construction created a wide protest because of the site's impact.

== Amount of energy ==
The Elgea-Urkilla eolic park will generate 66 million kW, sufficient for 100,000 people. The 40 aerogenerators of 600 kW will generate electricity at a 690 V tension, elevated to 20 kV because of the transformer 0.69/20 kV inside the central tower of each generator. The mills are interconnected creating three half tensioned groups from which underground connections connect the generator and the transformer´s substation. The substation, which is situated at 1,500 metres (4,900 ft) from the 40th generator, elevates the tension to 220 kV. Finally the energy is sent to the Vitoria-Itxaso line, property of Iberdrola, and providing power to Alava and some villages of Gipuzkoa. This park will reduce the carbon dioxide emissions by 60,000 tonnes along with 240,000 tonnes of sulphur dioxide.

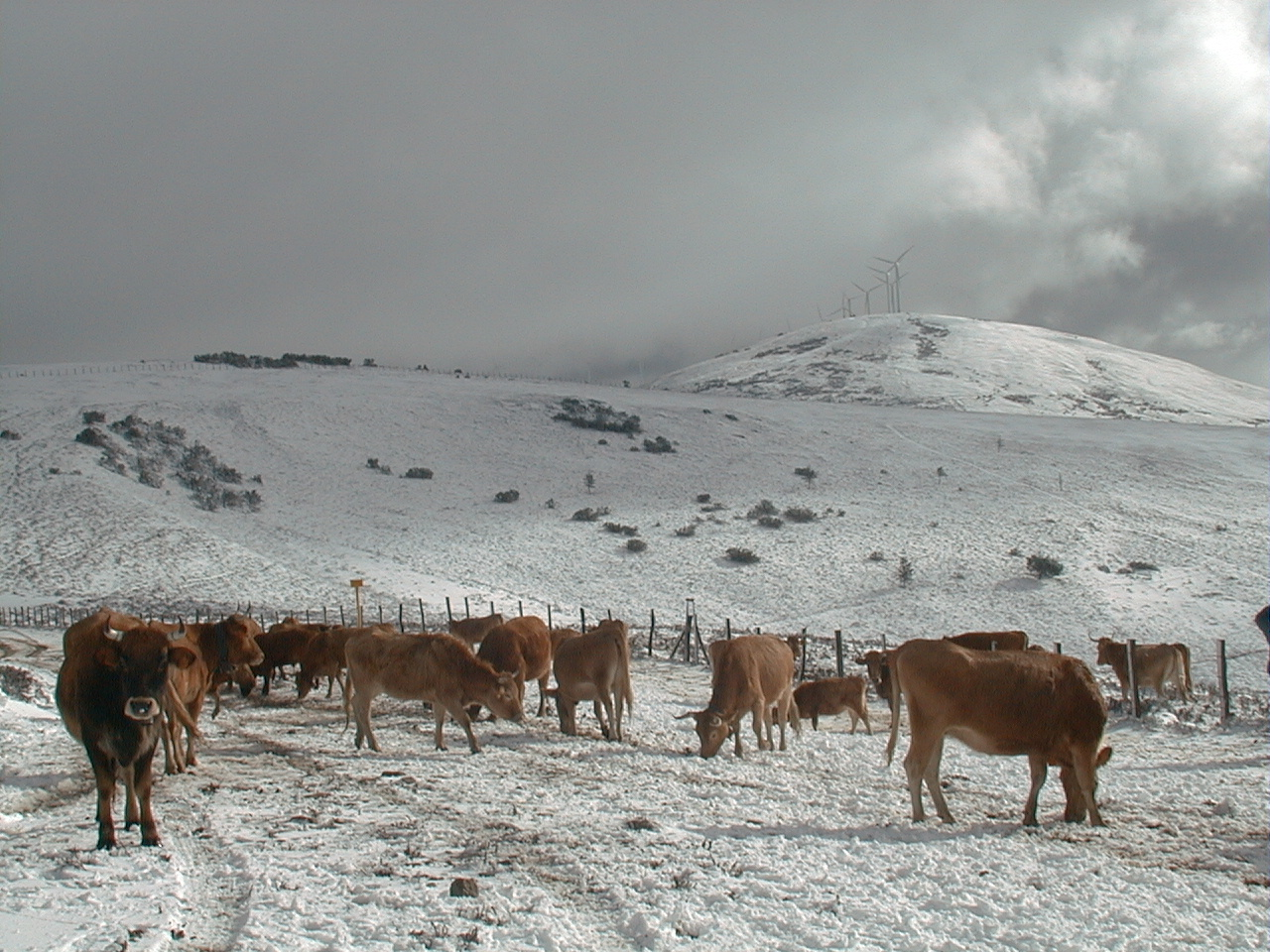
Some of the wind mills of the eolic park.

== Environmental and natural impact ==
The Elgea-Urkilla eolic park project was presented at the Spanish Viceconsejería de Medio Ambiente in order to examine the environmental impact. The eolic park passed this examination, but the government added environmental conditions, including a requirement to build the substation on the valley floor. This change cost 224.999.588 PTA.

=== Naturalists or groups against this project ===
- Eugenio Ruiz Urrestarazu
- The Gipuzkoa Federation of Mountain and Climbing Sports
- Euskal Herritarrok

== Characteristics ==
The underground electric connections are made of nine copper conductors with a diameter of 240 millimetres (9.4 in). Two have a DHZ1 12/20 kV isolation buried directly at a depth of 1.1 metres (3 ft 7 in).
