= Aizkorri-Aratz Natural Park =

Natural park in the Basque Country, Spain

Coordinates: 43°N 2.5°W

- Parque natural de Aizkorri-Aratz; Aizkorri-Arazko natura parkea
- IUCN category V (protected landscape/seascape)
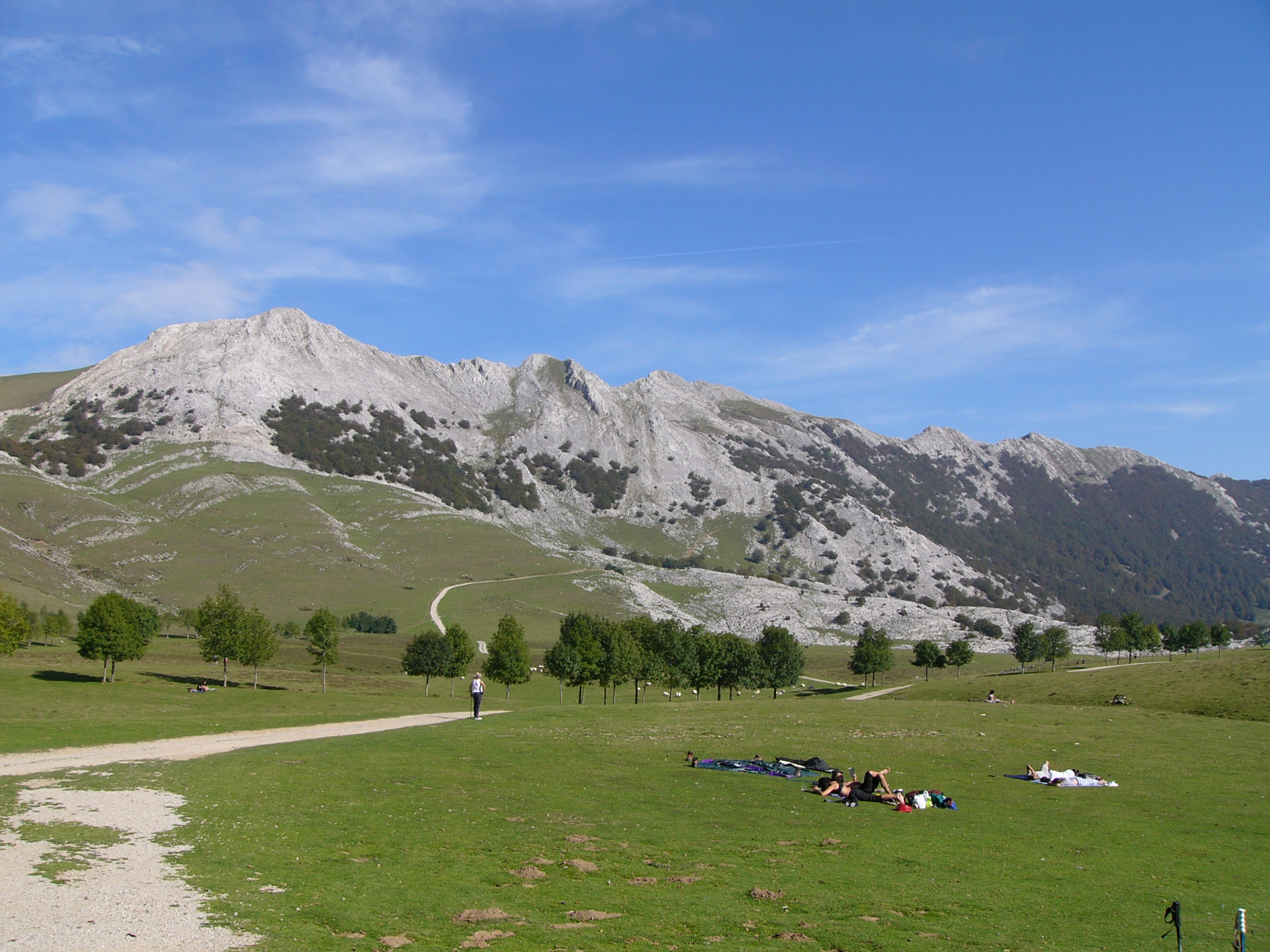
- The fields of Urbia, with Aizkorri in the background

- Location within the Basque Country
- Location: Álava and Gipuzkoa, Basque Country, Spain
- Area: 159.2 km^{2} (61.5 sq mi)
- Established: 4 April 2006

Natura 2000 site (SAC)
- Official name: Aizkorri-Aratz
- Designated: May 2016
- Reference no.: ES2120002

The Aizkorri-Aratz Natural Park is the second-largest natural park in the Basque Country. Straddling the Cantabrian-Mediterranean watershed, it is named Aizkorri and Aratz, the two most notable mountains in the park. Declared a natural park in 2006, the area contains limestone mountains and as well as dense beech forests.

== Location and weather ==
The park is in the provinces of Gipuzkoa (about 80 per cent) and Álava (about 20 per cent). The side in Álava is part of the municipalities of Asparrena, Barrundia, San Millán/Donemiliaga and Zalduondo; while the Gipuzkoan side is within Aretxabaleta, Eskoriatza, Legazpi, Leintz-Gatzaga, Oñati, Zegama and Zerain. The whole area of the Parzonería General de Guipúzcoa y Álava (a communal pasture not belonging to any municipality) is entirely within the park.

The park has a humid climate, with no drought in the summer. Being located in the Cantabrian-Mediterranean watershed, the northern slope is wetter than the southern. The climate varies from area to area due to differences in the terrain. The summers are mild, but the winters are cold.

== Landscape ==
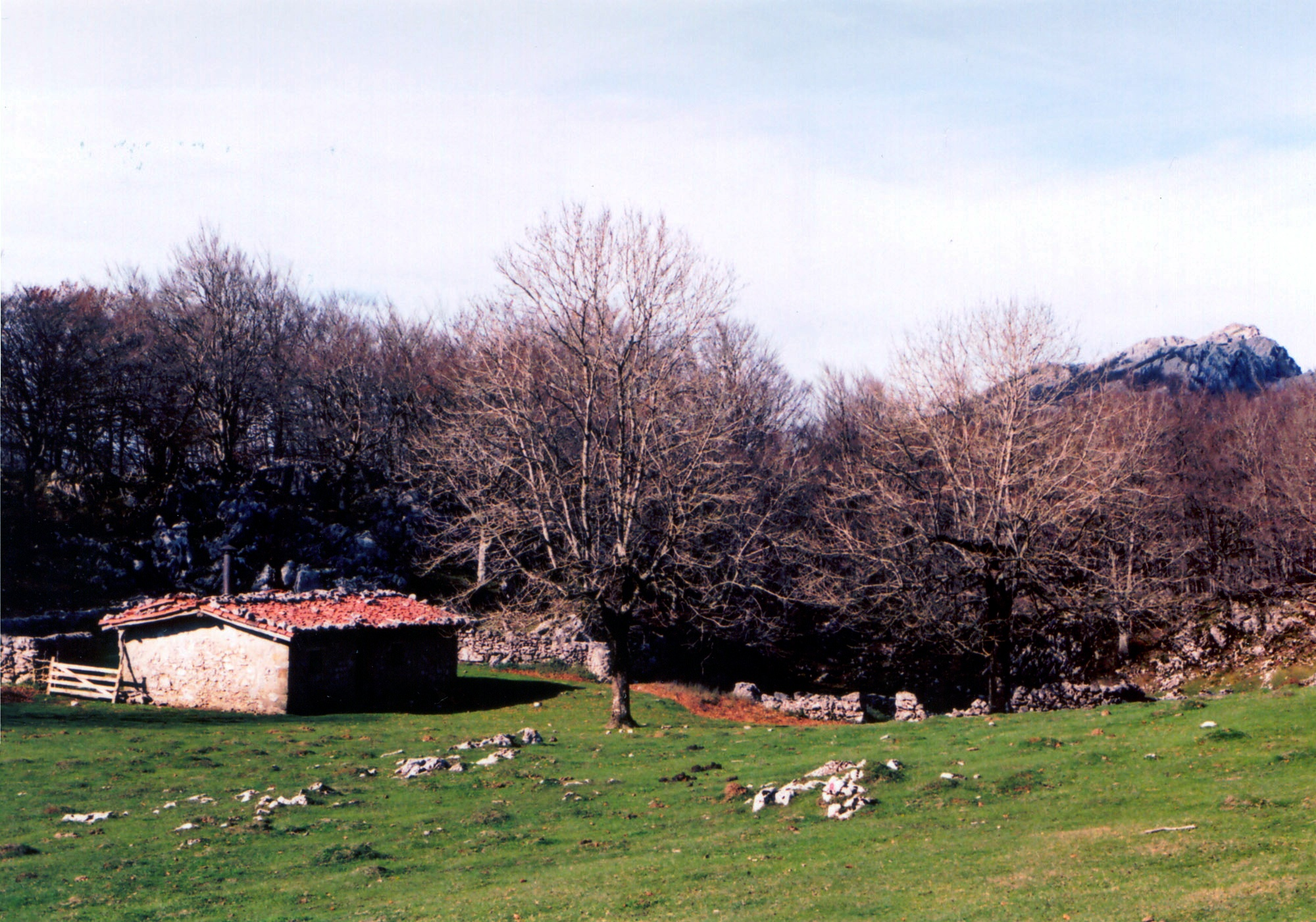
A sheep barn in Aratz

Although the mountains are the most noticeable characteristic of the park, the area has vegetation, fauna, and phenomena not present in other mountainous areas.

=== Mountains ===
The park is in a mountain area belonging to the Basque Mountains between Aralar and Urkiola, which is one of the corridors linking the Pyrenees to the Cantabrian Mountains. The highest summits of the Basque Autonomous Community, the peaks of Aitxuri (1,551 m (5,089 ft)) and Aizkorri (1,544 m (5,066 ft)), are located within the park.

=== Geology ===
The eastern area around Aizkorri and Aratz is mostly formed by Urgonian limestone, which give rise karstic phenomena such as ridges, sinkholes, torques, and ravines. Notable formations include the La Lece sinkhole, San Adrián tunnel, the Urbia depression, and the Arantzazu ravine. Towards the west, sandstone and clay are more common, resulting in mountains with more gentle slopes.

=== Flora and fauna ===
Autochthonous forests are conserved within the park, mostly consisting of beech and white oak; with smaller Quercus pubescens and Q. robur forests present. Higher mountains areas are covered in grass and shrubs. Species endemic to the Iberian Peninsula include Genista teretifolia, Narcissus asturiensis, N. vardulensis and Saxifraga losae.

The fauna of the park varies depending on the habitat. Two notable amphibians with a reduced presence in the Basque Country are the Alpine newt and the Iberian frog. Bird species include the peregrine falcon, the Eurasian griffon vulture, the Egyptian vulture, the Alpine chough, the red-billed chough, the Alpine accentor, the water pipit and the common rock thrush. The forests are home to species including the European pine marten, the European polecat and the wildcat.

== Archaeological remains ==
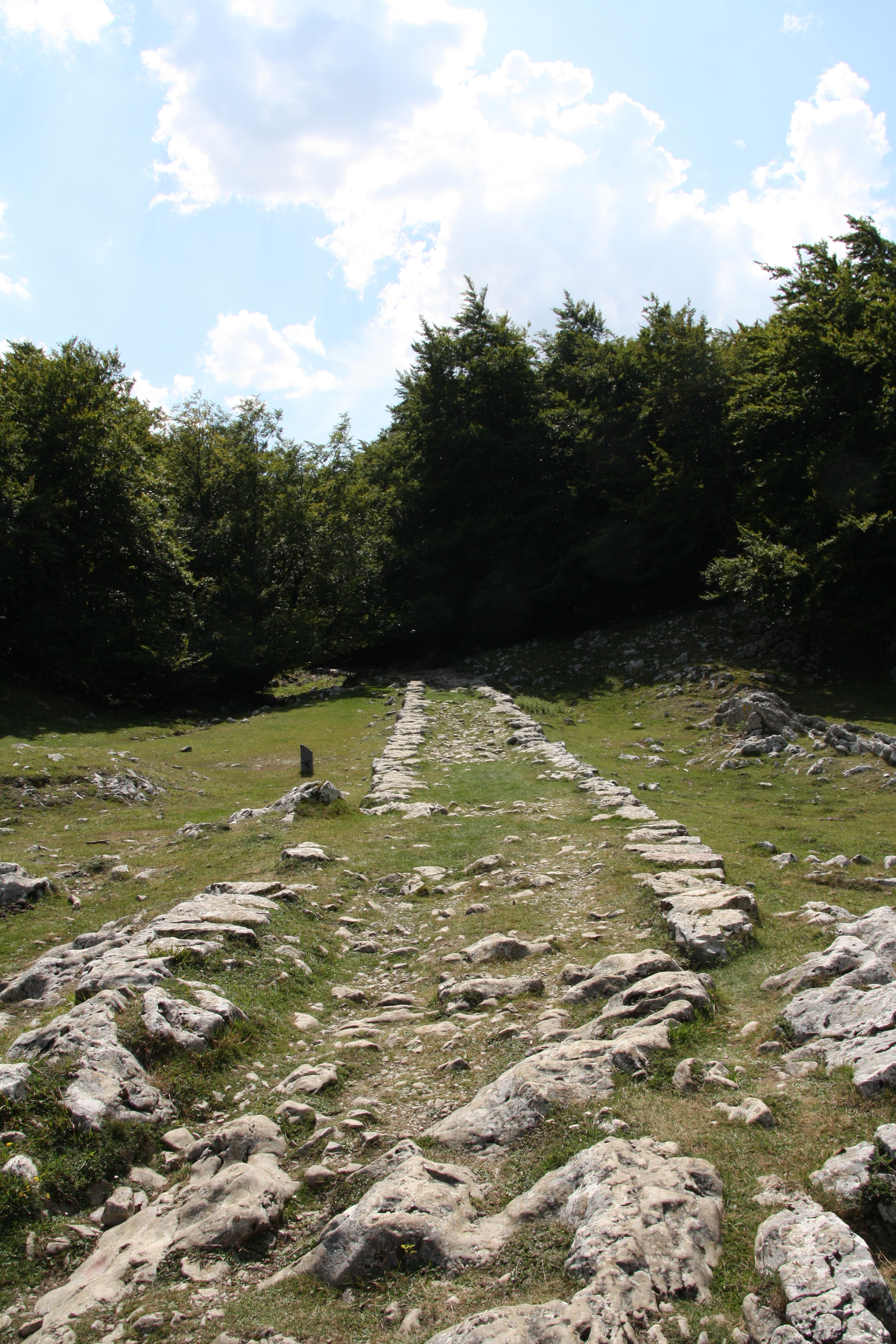
The San Adrián paved road

Because of the karstic properties of the rock, there are many caves in the park. Most of them, including Arrikrutz and Aizkirri, have prehistoric deposits, including the remains of lions and bears. Bronze Age remains have been found at the San Adrián tunnel, a natural pass that links Alava and Gipuzkoa.

To the south of the San Adrián tunnel, the remains of a stone paved road extend for about 2.5 km (1.6 mi). Despite often being called a Roman road, it was probably built in the 16th century, with most of the current remains dating from the 18th century. Both the tunnel and the road are part of the Camino de Santiago.
