= Alberto Iñurrategi =

Basque Spanish mountaineer

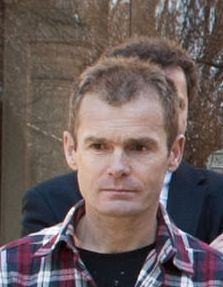
Alberto Iñurrategi, 2012

Alberto Iñurrategi Iriarte (November 3, 1968) is a Basque Spanish mountaineer born in Aretxabaleta, Gipuzkoa, Basque Country. In the year 2002, he became the second Basque and Spaniard (after Juanito Oiarzabal) and the 10th person to climb the 14 eight-thousanders.

He was 33 years old when he completed the eight-thousanders which made him the youngest person at the time to climb all 14. Iñurrategi climbed 12 of the eight-thousanders with his brother Felix Iñurrategi who died on the descent after summiting Gasherbrum II, in January 2000 at 33 years old. Iñurrategi climbed the peaks in alpine style using few lines or sherpas and no bottled oxygen. Iñurrategi was the 4th person to climb all 14 peaks without bottled oxygen.

In collaboration with other climbers, he has produced several climbing documentaries such as Gure Himalaya ("Our Hymalaya" in Basque) and Hire Himalaya ("Your Himalaya" in Basque, dedicated to his brother), Annapurna: sueño y vacío ("Annapurna: dream and hollowness" in Spanish).

In 2017, together with the Basque mountaineers Juan Vallejo and Mikel Zabalza, Iñurrategi was recognized by the Spanish Consejo Superior de Deportes, for rescuing the Italian Valerio Annovazzi from Gasherbrum II.

== Eight-thousander ascents ==
- 30.09.1991: Makalu (8485 m)
- 25.09.1992: Mount Everest (8848 m)
- 24.06.1994: K2 (8611 m)
- 11.09.1995: Cho Oyu (8188 m)
- 27.09.1995: Lhotse (8516 m)
- 06.05.1996: Kangchenjunga (8586 m)
- 11.10.1996: Shishapangma (8027 m)
- 13.07.1997: Broad Peak (8051 m)
- 23.05.1998: Dhaulagiri (8167 m)
- 29.07.1999: Nanga Parbat (8125 m)
- 25.04.2000: Manaslu (8163 m)
- 28.07.2000: Gasherbrum II (8034 m)
- 08.07.2001: Hidden Peak (8080 m)
- 16.05.2002: Annapurna (8091 m)

== See also ==
- List of climbers, alpinists and mountaineers
- List of 20th century summiters of Mount Everest
