= Gipuzkoa =

Province of Spain

Gipuzkoa Guipúzcoa (Spanish)
- Province
- Historical Territory of Gipuzkoa; Gipuzkoako Lurralde Historikoa (Basque); Territorio Histórico de Gipuzkoa (Spanish)
- Flag Coat of arms
- Motto(s): Latin: Fidelissima Bardulia Numquam Superata ("Most faithful Bardulia, never conquered")
- Location of the Province of Gipuzkoa in Spain
- Coordinates: 43°10′N 2°10′W
- Country: Spain
- Autonomous community: Basque Country
- Capital: San Sebastián
- Municipalities: 88

Government
  - Deputy General: Eider Mendoza (Basque Nationalist Party)

Area
  - Total: 1,981.14 km^{2} (764.92 sq mi)
  - Rank: 50th in Spain

Population (2025)
  - Total: 733,149
  - Rank: 23rd in Spain
  - Density: 370.064/km^{2} (958.462/sq mi)
- Demonym(s): Basque, Gipuzkoar
- Time zone: UTC+1 (CET)
  - Summer (DST): UTC+2 (CEST)
- Postal code: 20
- ISO 3166 code: ES-SS
- Official languages: Basque, Spanish
- Parliament: Cortes Generales
- Congress seats: 6 (of 350)
- Senate seats: 4 (of 264)
- General Assembly of Gipuzkoa: 51
- Website: Gipuzkoako Foru Aldundia

The Province of Gipuzkoa (US: /ɡiːˈpuːskoʊə/ ghee-POO-skoh-ə, Basque: [ɡiˈpus̻ko.a]; Spanish: Guipúzcoa [ɡiˈpuθkoa]; French: Guipuscoa) is a province of Spain in the Basque Autonomous Community, and a historical territory of the Basque Country. Its capital city is San Sebastián (Donostia in Basque). Gipuzkoa shares borders at its northeast with Labourd in the French Basque Country, which is in the department of Pyrénées-Atlantiques, with the province and autonomous community of Navarre at the east, Biscay at the west, Álava at the southwest and the Bay of Biscay to its north. It is located at the easternmost extreme of the Cantabric Sea, in the Bay of Biscay. It has 66 kilometres (41 miles) of coastline.

With an area of 1,981.14 square kilometres (764.92 square miles), Gipuzkoa is the smallest province of Spain. The province has 89 municipalities and a population of 733,149 inhabitants, from which more than half live in the San Sebastian metropolitan area. Apart from the capital, other important cities are Irun, Errenteria, Zarautz, Mondragón, Eibar, Hondarribia, Oñati, Tolosa, Beasain and Pasaia.

Gipuzkoa is the province of the Basque Country in which the Basque language is the most extensively used since 49.1% of its population spoke Basque in 2006.

== Etymology ==
The first recorded name of the province was Ipuscoa in a document from the year 1025. During the following years, and in various documents, several similar names appear, such as Ipuzcoa, Ipuçcha, Ipuzka, among others.

The full etymology the word Gipuzkoa has not been fully ascertained, but links have been made with the Basque word Giputz, containing the root ip- which is related to the word ipar (north), ipurdi (back) and ipuin (tale). According to this, ipuzko (one of the several first known denominations) might refer to something "to the north" or "in the north".

== Names ==
=== Gipuzkoa ===
Gipuzkoa is the Basque spelling recommended by the Royal Academy of the Basque Language, and it is commonly used in official documents in that language. The Basque spelling is also mandatory in official texts from the various Spanish public administrations, even in documents written in Spanish. It is the spelling most frequently used by the Spanish-language media in the Basque Country.

It is also the spelling used in the Basque version of the Spanish constitution and in the Basque version of the Statute of Autonomy of the Basque Country. Gipuzkoa is also the only official spelling approved for the historical territory by the Juntas Generales of the province.

=== Guipúzcoa ===
Guipúzcoa is the spelling in Spanish, and it has been determined by the Association of Spanish Language Academies as being the only correct use outside official Spanish documents in which the Basque spelling is mandatory. (Note: The change in the official Spanish policy regarding the naming of Gipuzkoa dates only from 2011, and the last (and first) edition of the Panhispanic dictionary of doubts dates from 2005. The specific case of the spelling of Guipúzcoa is therefore not included. However, the articles for Lérida and Gerona indicate that will be the criterion followed for the Guipúzcoa article in the edition that is currently under elaboration.) It is also the Spanish spelling used in the Spanish version of the Constitution and in the Spanish version of the Statute of Autonomy of the Basque Country.

== Geography ==
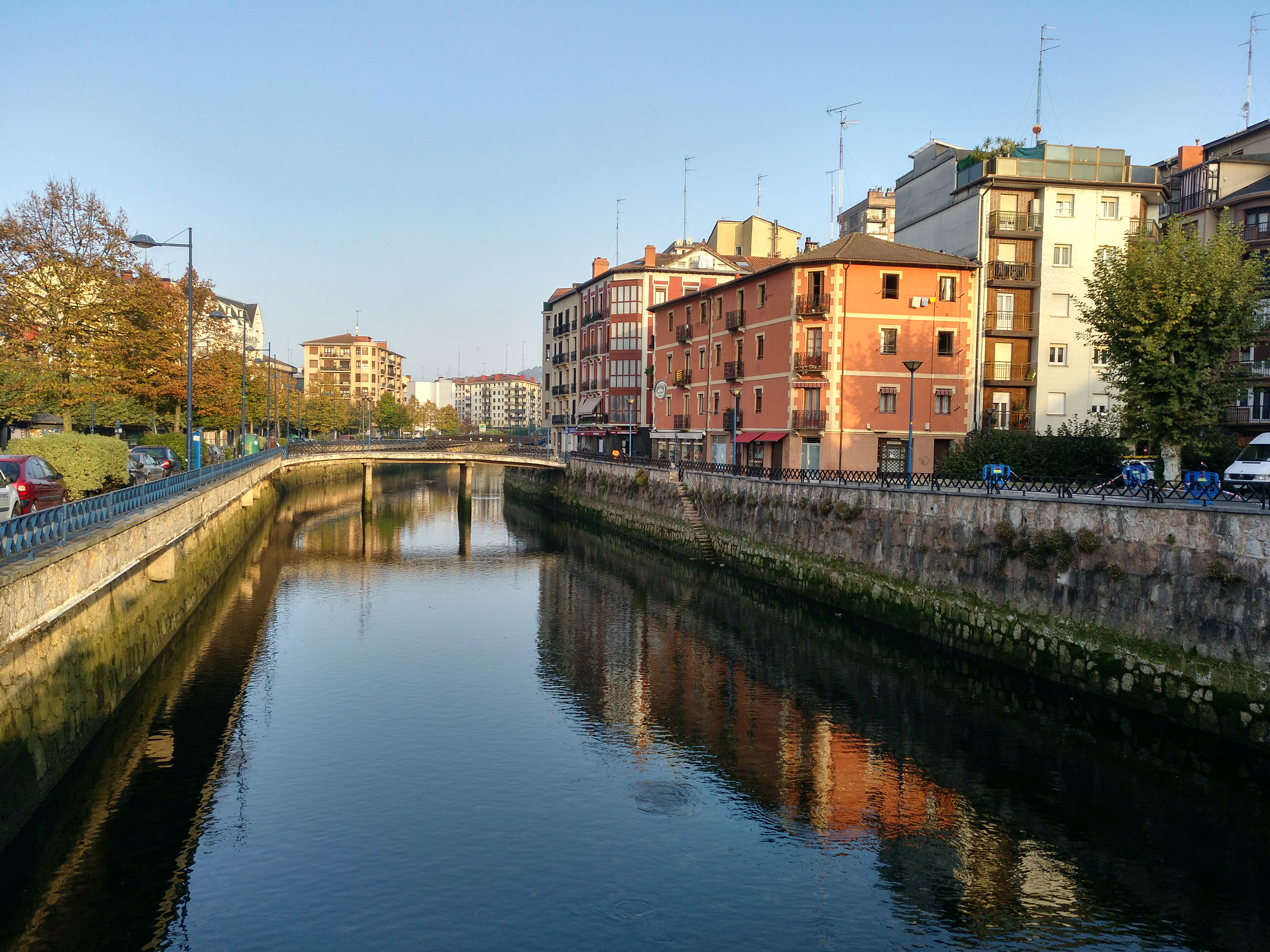
The Oiartzun river passing through Errenteria

Gipuzkoa is hilly and green linking mountain and sea, and heavily populated with numerous urban nuclei that dot the whole territory. The conspicuous presence of hills and rugged terrain has added to a special leaning towards hiking, nature and mountains on the part of Gipuzkoans. Some mountains have an emblematic or iconic significance in the local tradition, their summits being topped with crosses, memorials and mountaineer postboxes. In addition, pilgrimages which have gradually lost their former religious zeal and taken on a more secular slant are sometimes held to their summits. Some renowned mountains are Aiako Harria, Hernio, Txindoki, Aizkorri and Izarraitz, amongst others.

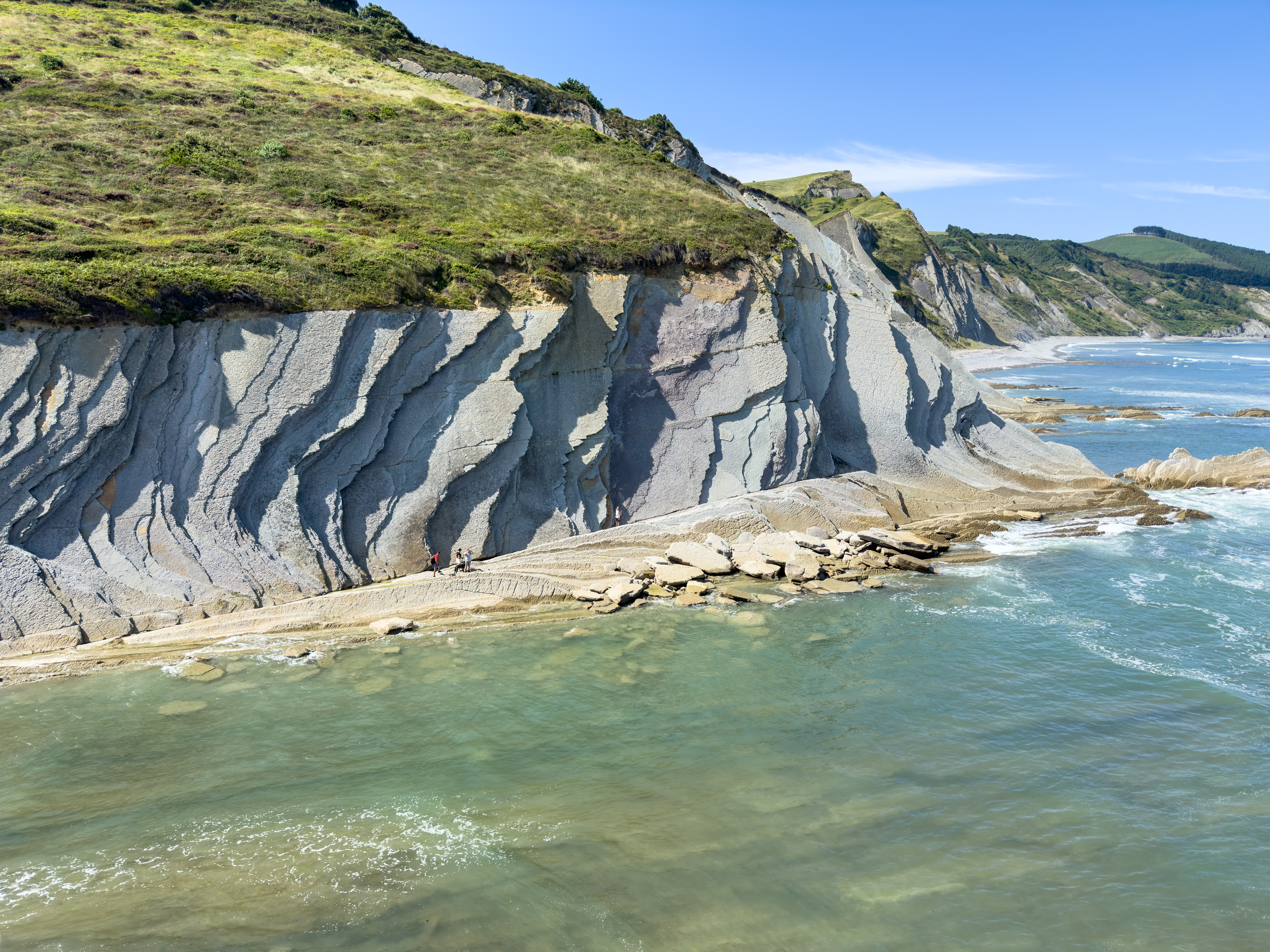
Algorri beach in Zumaia

The Aralar Natural Park is a conservation area on the border of Gipuzkoa and Navarre in the Aralar Range.

The rivers of Gipuzkoa are distinctly different from other Bay of Biscay rivers. They arise in the hilly Basque inland landscape (Basque Mountains), flow in a south- north direction, forming close, narrow valleys before joining the ocean. The rivers extend for a short length with only a small fluctuation in the volume of water thanks to the stable rainfall all year round, and they show an abrupt drop between origin and mouth as far as the length of the river is concerned. From west to east the rivers are the Deba, Urola, Oria, Urumea, Oiartzun and Bidasoa. Except for a narrow strip extending east from the hamlet Otzaurte (Zegama) and the tunnel of San Adrian, the province drains its waters to the Atlantic basin.

=== Climate ===
Gipuzkoa has an oceanic climate, characterized by its low variation in temperature, with cool summers, moderate winters and abundant rain throughout the year. The climate promotes the growth of lush vegetation.

The area is windy for most of the year with those from the north-northwest bringing significant moisture from the ocean. Rainfall is abundant due to the wind direction and hilly region of the province, with rainfall ranging between 1200 and 1700 mm per year. Cloud cover is also high.

The climate is oceanic, with few thermal fluctuations and abundant rainfall (1400 mm per year). The rainfall and relief have a hydrography defined by rivers of short length, although large and regular; The main ones are the Bidasoa, the Oyarzun, the Urumea, the Oria, the Urola and the Deva. Their agricultural utility, as a consequence of the rainfall, is minimal, although they have been the basis of an industry that has ended up contaminating its waters. The predominant vegetation, also conditioned by the climate, is the boreal forest, with deciduous species that alternate with meadows.

== Demographics ==
Historical population
Year	Pop.	±%
1842	112,814	—
1857	156,493	+38.7%
1877	170,209	+8.8%
1887	181,149	+6.4%
1900	196,531	+8.5%
1910	221,427	+12.7%
1920	260,504	+17.6%
1930	296,269	+13.7%
1940	325,003	+9.7%
1950	371,024	+14.2%
1960	473,901	+27.7%
1970	626,049	+32.1%
1981	694,681	+11.0%
1991	676,488	−2.6%
2001	673,563	−0.4%
2011	708,425	+5.2%
2021	725,508	+2.4%
Source: INE

As of 2025, the population is 733,149, of which 48.9% are males, and 51.1% are females. Minors make up 15.7% of the population, and seniors make up 24.0%.

=== Immigration ===
As of 2025, immigrants make up 13.9% of the population. The 5 largest foreign countries of birth are Morocco, Colombia, Nicaragua, Honduras, and Romania.

== Government ==
=== Juntas Generales ===
The Juntas Generales of Gipuzkoa are the unicameral assembly of the province. Its members are elected by universal suffrage every four years.

=== Municipalities ===
The province has 88 municipalities:

- Abaltzisketa
- Aduna
- Aia
- Aizarnazabal
- Albiztur
- Alegia
- Alkiza
- Altzaga
- Altzo
- Amezketa
- Andoain
- Anoeta
- Antzuola
- Arama
- Aretxabaleta
- Asteasu
- Astigarraga
- Ataun
- Azkoitia
- Azpeitia
- Baliarrain
- Beasain
- Beizama
- Belauntza
- Berastegi
- Bergara
- Berrobi
- Bidania-Goiatz
- Deba
- Eibar
- Elduain
- Elgeta
- Elgoibar
- Errenteria
- Errezil
- Eskoriatza
- Ezkio-Itsaso
- Gabiria
- Gaintza
- Gaztelu
- Getaria
- Hernani
- Hernialde
- Hondarribia
- Ibarra
- Idiazabal
- Ikaztegieta
- Irun
- Irura
- Itsasondo
- Larraul
- Lasarte-Oria
- Lazkao
- Leaburu-Txarama
- Legazpi
- Legorreta
- Leintz Gatzaga
- Lezo
- Lizartza
- Mendaro
- Mondragón
- Mutiloa
- Mutriku
- Oiartzun
- Olaberria
- Oñati
- Ordizia
- Orendain
- Orexa
- Orio
- Ormaiztegi
- Pasaia
- San Sebastián
- Segura
- Soraluze-Placencia de las Armas
- Tolosa
- Urnieta
- Urretxu
- Usurbil
- Villabona
- Zaldibia
- Zarautz
- Zegama
- Zerain
- Zestoa
- Zizurkil
- Zumaia
- Zumarraga

Largest municipalities in the province of Gipuzkoa INE - 2025
Rank		Comarca	Pop.	Rank		Comarca	Pop.
1	San Sebastián	Donostialdea	189,507	11	Pasaia	Donostialdea	16,172
2	Irun	Bidasoa Behea	63,737	12	Azpeitia	Urola Kosta	15,297
3	Errenteria	Donostialdea	39,341	13	Andoain	Donostialdea	14,505
4	Eibar	Debabarrena	27,464	14	Bergara	Debagoiena	14,415
5	Zarautz	Urola Kosta	23,467	15	Beasain	Goierri	14,019
6	Mondragón	Debagoiena	22,411	16	Azkoitia	Urola Kosta	11,768
7	Hernani	Donostialdea	20,378	17	Elgoibar	Debabarrena	11,709
8	Tolosa	Tolosaldea	20,121	18	Oñati	Debagoiena	11,518
9	Lasarte-Oria	Donostialdea	19,413	19	Ordizia	Goierri	10,792
10	Hondarribia	Bidasoa Behea	16,768	20	Oiartzun	Donostialdea	10,468

== Culture ==
Gipuzkera, a dialect of the Basque language spoken in most of the region, shows a considerable vitality and holds a prominent position among other dialects. A 2021 survey found that 51.8% of the population spoke Basque.

The Basque cultural element is apparent, including traditional dances and singing, bertsolaritza, trikiti and txistu music, baserris dotting the rural landscape, town festivals, and its signature heavy sculptures (stone, steel, iron) from the industrial tradition, all blending with the latest Basque, Spanish and international pop culture events and design trends centred in major urban areas (San Sebastián, Tolosa, etc.).

Traditionally a Catholic province, its patron saints are the Society of Jesus' Ignatius of Loyola, a native of this province born in the neighborhood of Loyola (Azpeitia), and Our Lady of Arantzazu.

The region has produced many famous Basque athletes for example: Jose Maria Olazabal (golfer), José Ángel Iribar, Mikel Arteta and Xabi Alonso (footballers), Abraham Olano and Domingo Perurena (cyclists), Edurne Pasaban and Alberto Iñurrategi (mountaineers), Iñaki Urdangarin (handball player), Maite Zúñiga (runner) and Paulino Uzcudun (boxer). Professional tennis player Garbiñe Muguruza's father is also a native of Gipuzkoa.

== Infrastructure ==
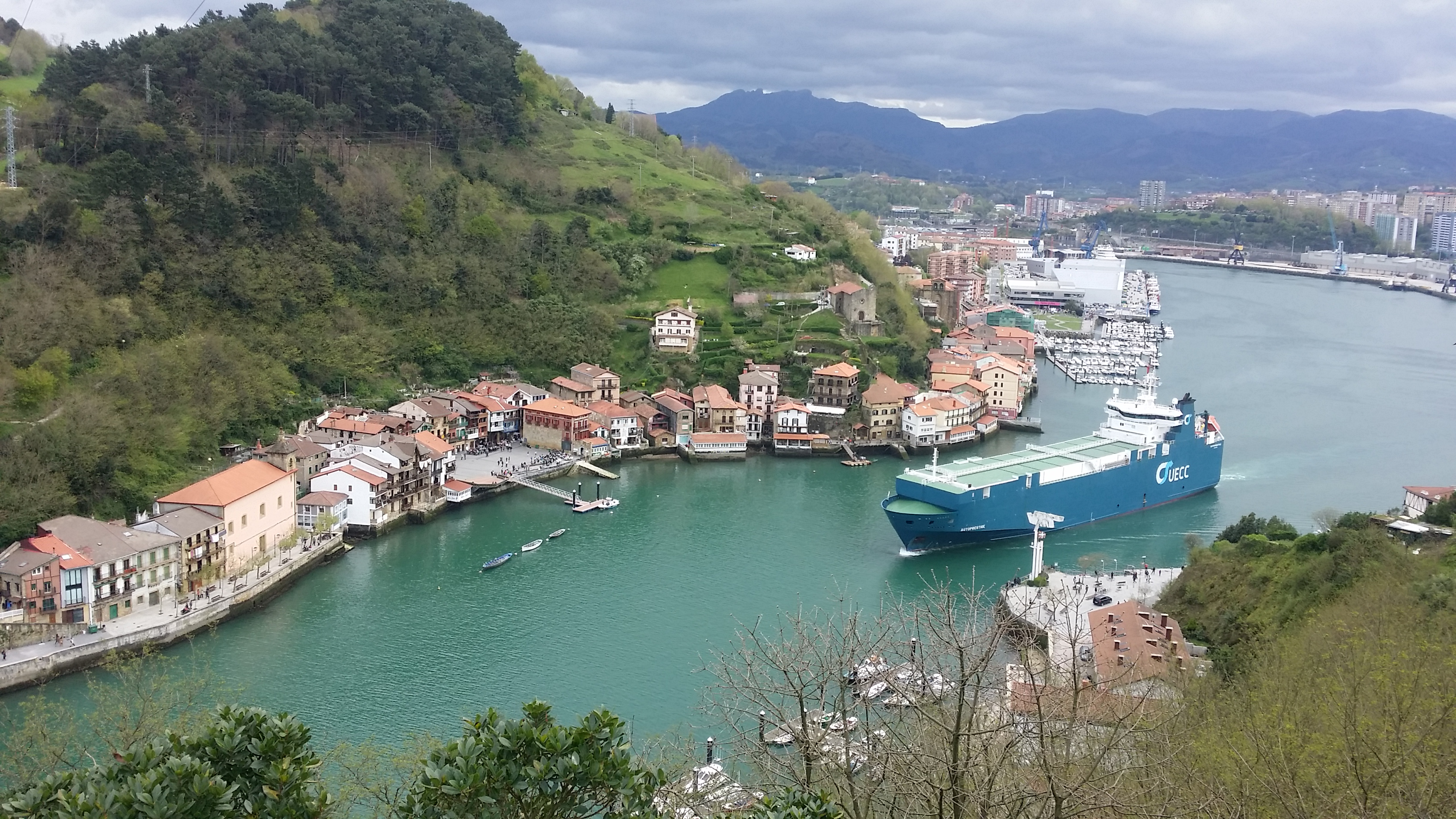
Inlet to the harbour of Pasaia

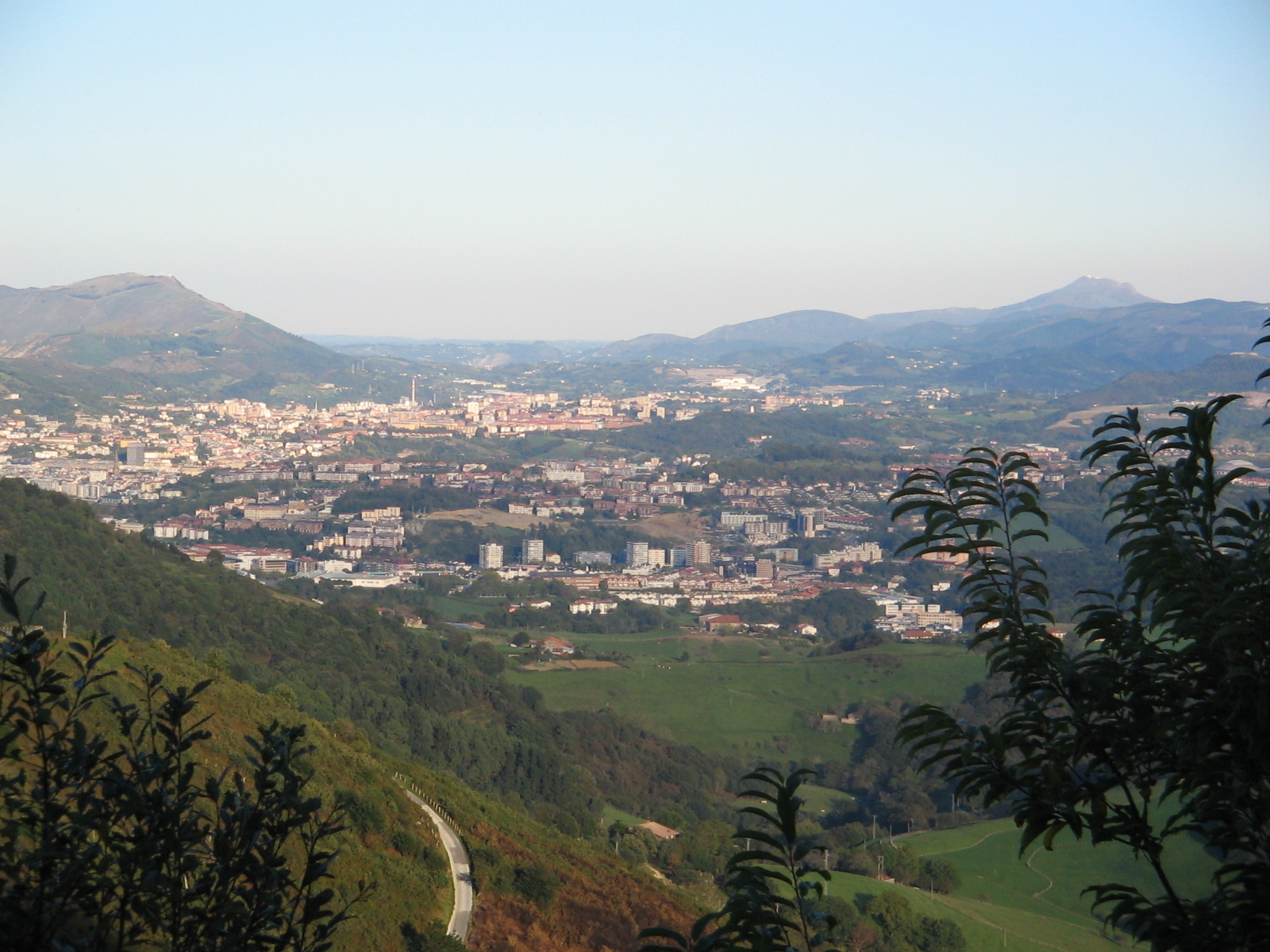
San Sebastian and Pasaia flanked at either side by Mounts Jaizkibel and Larrun

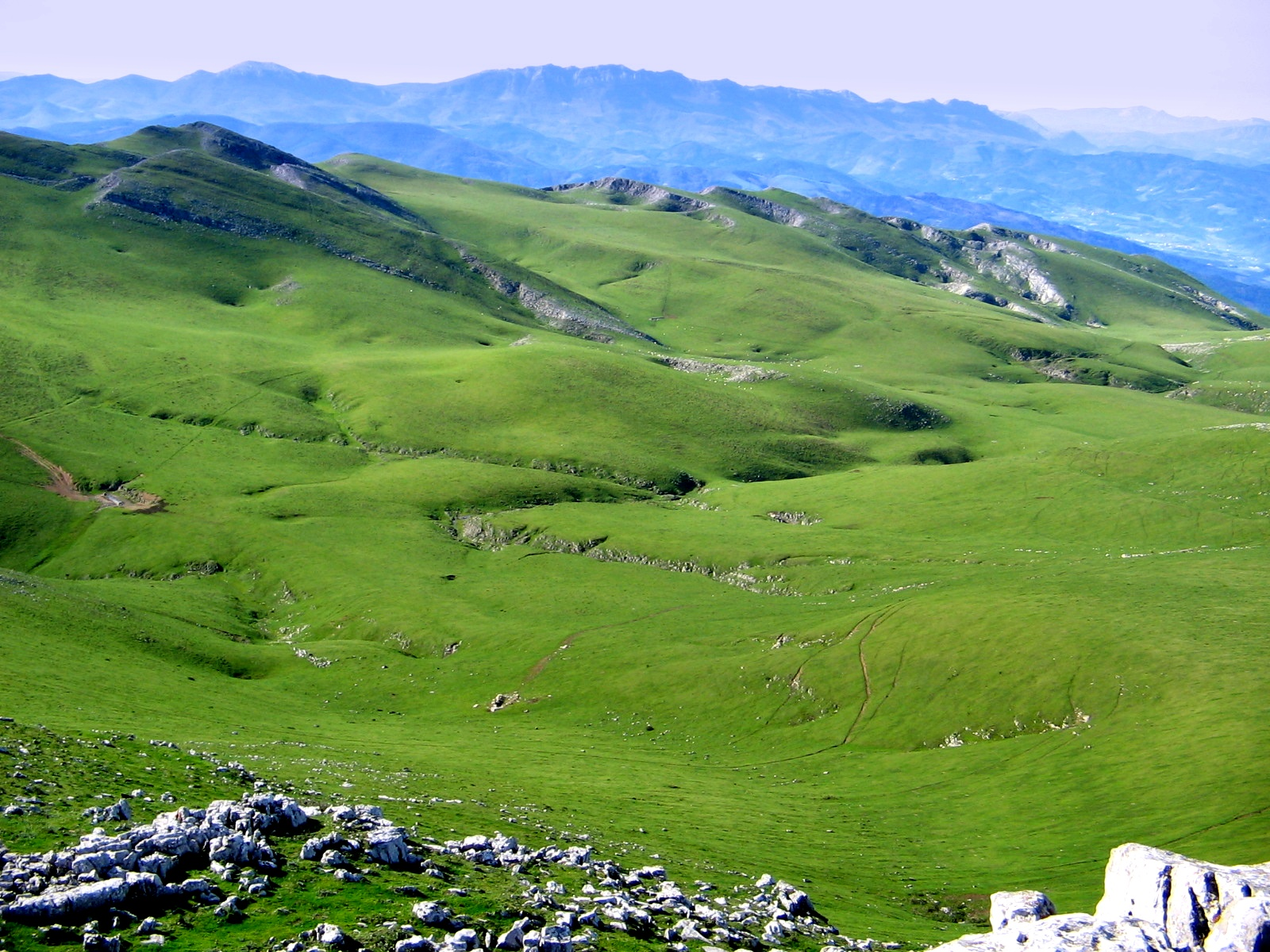
View to the SW from Ganbo Txiki in Aralar, with Aratz and the Aizkorri ridge in the background

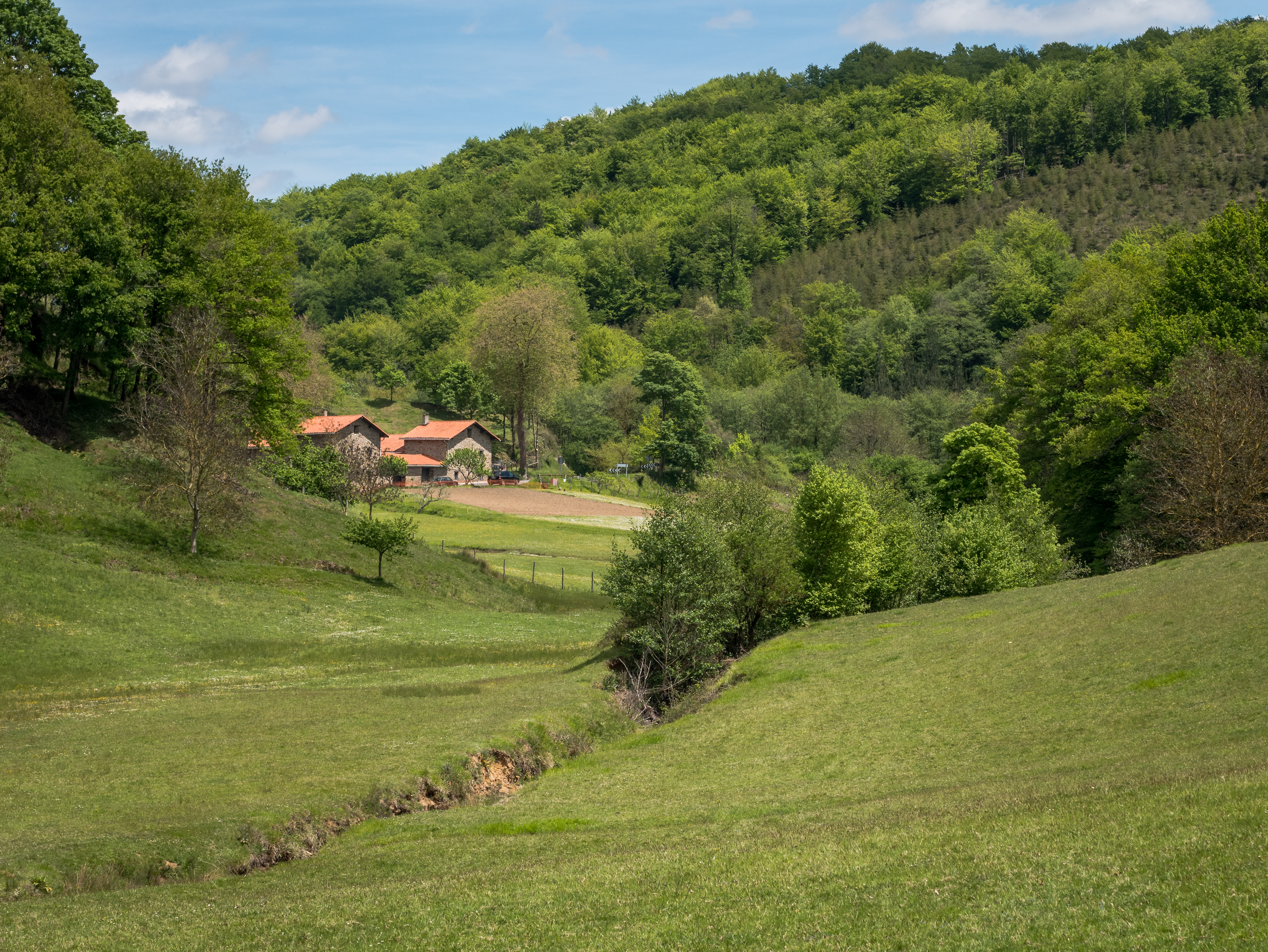
Meadows near the Arlaban mountain pass

The region's communication layout is in step with its geographical features, with the main lines of infrastructure along a north -south axis up to recent times along the rivers heading to the ocean. Accordingly, the inland Way of St. James, i.e. the Tunnel Route penetrated the province via Irun and turned south-west along the Oria River towards the provincial limits at the tunnel of San Adrian. This stretch was in operation up to 1765 when the Royal Road moved to the western Deba Valley. A minor St. James route crossed Gipuzkoa east to west along the coast.

Currently, the main road cutting through Gipuzkoa largely follows that layout, i.e. the N-1 E-5 from Irun to San Sebastián and on to Altsasu all along the Oria River for the most part (gateway to Navarre through the pass of Etxegarate). Also, the major Irun-Madrid railway runs close to the river up to its very origin on the slopes of Aizkorri at train stop Otzaurte in Zegama. By 1973 engineering works for the Bilbao-Behobia A-8 E-70 motorway had been completed, with the new road cutting across the valleys east to west and turning into the main axis between San Sebastián and Bilbao, besides enabling heavy load traffic to access the west and south of Spain as a toll road. The regional railway network Euskotren Trena also follows along the coast from east to west, while it proves impractical for long distance on the grounds of its tortuous layout and as it serves small towns. The railway network reaches the border town Hendaia before it changes to SNCF. Within the Donostialdea region, the San Sebastián Metro provides service.

The stretch of the A-15 motorway serving Gipuzkoa and Pamplona opened in 1995 embroiled in controversy under protest and an attack campaign led by ecologists, Basque leftist nationalists and eventually ETA. Conflict resolved after a deal about the definitive layout was struck. In January 2010, following a scheme drawn up by the regional government of Gipuzkoa to improve provisions for the ever-increasing road traffic, the Maltzaga-Urbina AP-1 motorway stretch leading to Gasteiz was completed, providing likewise access to the industrial areas of Arrasate and Bergara, the gateway to Álava by village Landa. AP-1 and N-1 E-5 are connected by a highway east to west from Bergara and Beasain. European traffic to south of Spain avoids San Sebastián's metropolitan area by means of the southern outer road ring.

The AVE high-speed rail is currently under construction, with an Y-type layout and links to the SNCF network in Hendaia (NE), Vitoria (SE), Bilbao (W) and Pamplona (S) to be completed by 2022. Contractors were appointed, works are in place although past schedule, while strong opposition (ecologists, Basque leftist nationalists,...) and serious financial tensions made its future uncertain.

The only airport in Gipuzkoa serving just domestic flights is the San Sebastian Airport located in Hondarribia, while the air transportation needs are usually served by the nearby Bilbao and Biarritz airports.

== Notable people ==
- Abraham Olano, road racing cyclist, 1995 world road champion, 1998 world time trial champion
- Ainhoa Arteta, soprano
- Alberto Iñurrategi, mountaineer
- Andoni Iraola Sagarna, former footballer and current head coach of Liverpool Football Club
- Andrés de Urdaneta, explorer and navigator
- Asier Illarramendi, footballer
- Bernardo Atxaga, writer
- Blas de Lezo, Admiral famed for the Battle of Cartagena de Indias
- Cosme Damián de Churruca y Elorza, Admiral of the Royal Spanish Armada
- Cristóbal Balenciaga, fashion designer
- Cristóbal de Oñate, explorer, conquistador and colonial official in New Spain
- Domingo Martínez de Irala, conquistador
- Eduardo Chillida, sculptor
- Edurne Pasaban, mountaineer
- Fernando de Villanueva (died 1679), governor of Spanish New Mexico between 1665 and 1668.
- Fernando Savater, philosopher
- Francisco de Ibarra, explorer, conquistador and the founder of the city of Durango
- Gabriel de Mendizábal Iraeta, General Officer who fought in the Peninsular War
- Ignacio Zuloaga, painter
- Irene Paredes, footballer
- Iker Martínez de Lizarduy Lizarribar, Olympic sailor
- Jorge Oteiza, sculptor
- José de Urrutia, Explorer and settler of Texas in the 1600s
- José María Olazábal, golfer and winner of Masters tournament
- Jose Miguel Barandiaran, anthropologist, paleontologist
- Josune Bereziartu, rock climber
- Joxe Azurmendi, philosopher
- Juan de Tolosa, explorer, conquistador and one of the founders of Zacatecas
- Juan de Urbieta, soldier who captured king Francis I of France
- Juan Mari Arzak, chef
- Juan Sebastián Elcano, first to circumnavigate the world, 1522
- Julen Lopetegui, football manager and former player.
- Karlos Arguiñano, chef, TV presenter and producer, and Basque pelota businessman
- Katalina Erauso, nun and soldier in the 17th century
- Koldo Mitxelena, linguist
- Lope de Aguirre, conquistador, known for his expedition of the mythical El Dorado
- Luis Arconada, footballer
- Luis Mariano, tenor
- Mariano Juaristi Atano III, Basque-pelota player
- Martín Berasategui, chef
- Martín de Murúa, friar and chronicler, made the earliest illustrated history of Peru.
- Martín Ignacio de Loyola, Franciscan friar and missionary, first person to complete the world circumnavigation twice - first time in both eastwards and westwards.
- Miguel de Oquendo y Segura, a Spanish admiral, second in command of the Spanish Armada
- Miguel López de Legazpi, navigator and Governor of Captaincy General of the Philippines
- Mikel Arteta, former footballer and current manager of Arsenal
- Paco Rabanne, fashion designer
- Pako Ayestarán, Spanish football manager, former Head Coach of Valencia CF.
- Pío Baroja y Nessi, writer
- San Ignacio de Loyola, saint and founder of the Society of Jesus
- Sta. Cándida María de Jesús, saint and founder of the Congregation of the Hijas de Jesús
- Sto. Domingo Ibáñez de Erquicia, Dominican Saint, Martyr
- Tirso de Olazábal, Count of Arbelaiz, Politician
- Unai Emery, current manager of Aston Villa
- Xabi Alonso, former footballer and current manager of Chelsea Football Club

== See also ==
- History of the Basques
- Treaties of Good Correspondence
