= Ernani José Machado Lake =

Lake Ernani José Machado
- Lago Ernani José Machado (Portuguese)
- Location within Brazil
- Interactive map of Lake Ernani José Machado
- Location: Lucas do Rio Verde, Mato Grosso, Brazil
- Coordinates: 13°03′55″S 55°54′49″W
- Type: artificial lake
- Primary inflows: Córrego Lucas
- Primary outflows: Rio Verde
- Basin countries: Brazil

Lake Ernani José Machado (Portuguese: Lago Ernani José Machado) is an artificial lake located in Lucas do Rio Verde, Brazil. Built in 2005, it has become one of the city's top tourist attractions. In its border it has a restaurant specialized in food with fish.
