= Hernani =

Hernani or Hernâni may refer to:

== Locations ==
- Hernani, Eastern Samar, a municipality in Eastern Samar, Philippines
- Hernani, Spain, a town in Gipuzkoa, Basque Autonomous Community, Spain
- Hernani, New South Wales Locality in New South Wales, Australia

== Other ==
- Hernani (drama), a Romantic drama by Victor Hugo
- Hernani CRE, a Spanish rugby union club

== People ==
- Hernani Azevedo Júnior (born 1994), Brazilian association football player
- Hernâni Ferreira da Silva (1931-2001), Portuguese association football player
- Hernâni José da Rosa (born 1984), Brazilian association football player
- Hernâni Jorge Santos Fortes (born 1991), Portuguese association football player
- Hernâni Neves (born 1963), Portuguese association football and beach soccer player
- Hernani Nogueira dos Santos (born 1976), Brazilian football player

== See also ==
- Ernani (disambiguation)
