= Aizkorri =

Mountain in Spain

Coordinates: 42°57′08″N 02°19′00″W

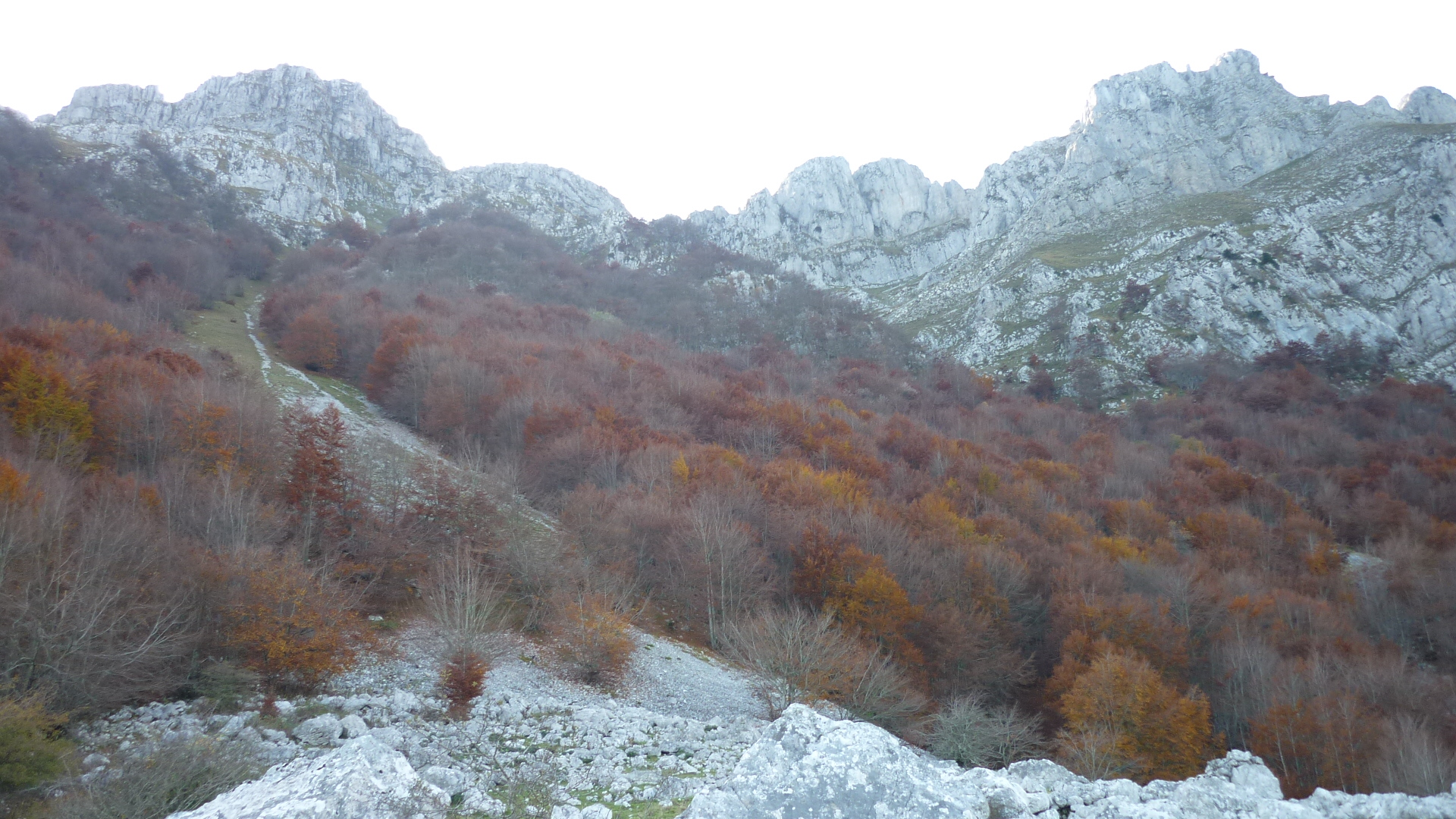
- Aizkorri crests.

Highest point
- Elevation: 1,551 m (5,089 ft)

Naming
- Language of name: Basque
- Pronunciation: Basque: [aisˈkori]

Geography
- Location: Gipuzkoa, Spain
- Parent range: Basque Mountains

Climbing
- Easiest route: From Arantzazu

Aizkorri or Aitzgorri (pronounced [aisˈkori], meaning in Basque 'bare stone', literally 'red stone') is a massif, the highest one of the Basque Autonomous Community (Spain) with 1,551 m AMSL at its highest point (peak Aitxuri, meaning 'white stone'). The massif is formed by a crest of limestone summits aligned north-west to south-east all in a row at the south of the province of Gipuzkoa, namely Artzanburu, Andreaitz, Arbelaitz (1,513 m), Iraule (1,511 m), Aitxuri, Aketegi (1,549 m) and Aizkorri (1,528 m). Despite its slightly lower height, this summit is the most popular one. The Aizkorri massif is one of the most conspicuous geological formations on the Basque Mountains range.

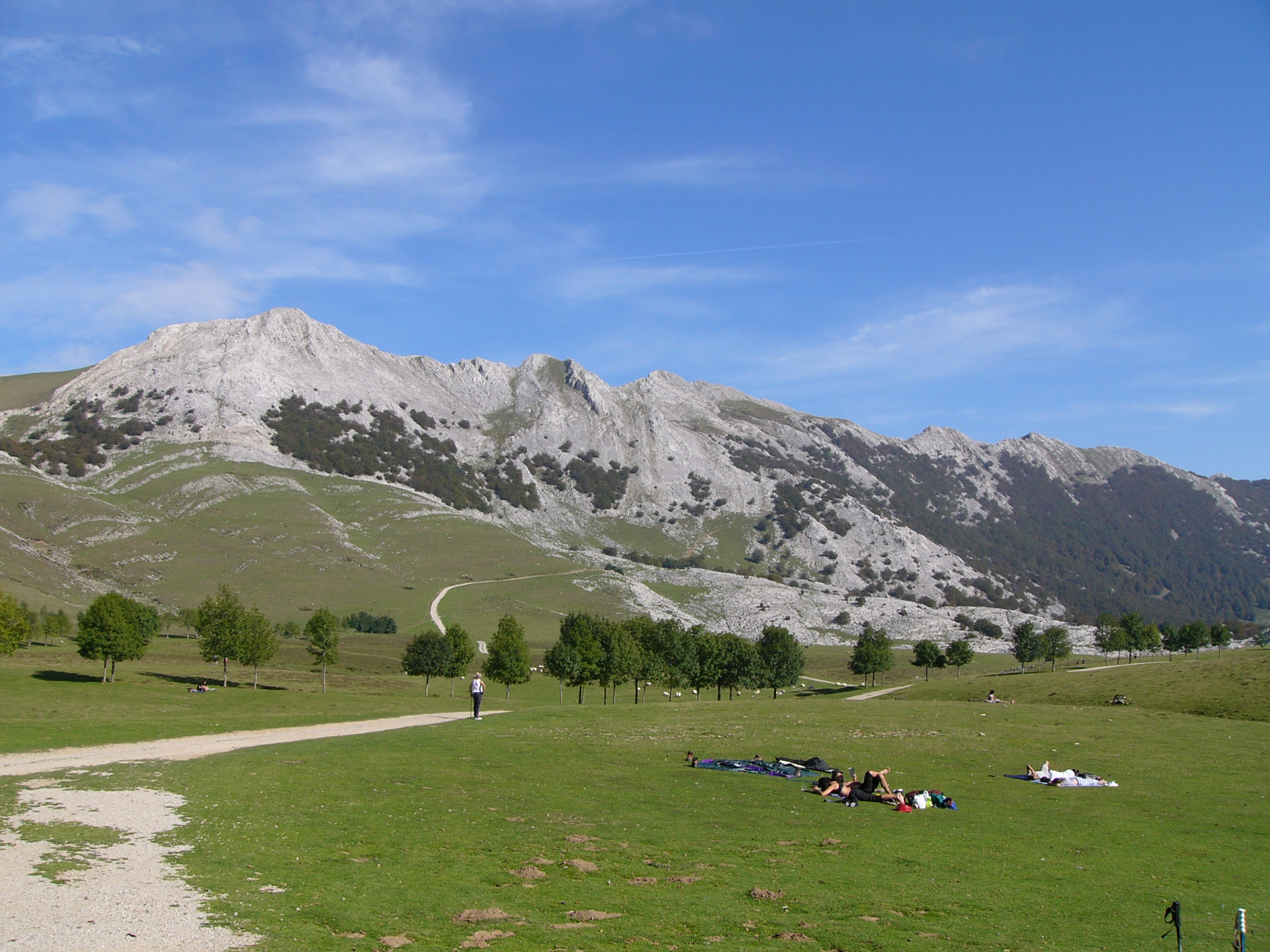
Aizkorri range viewed from the Urbia meadows

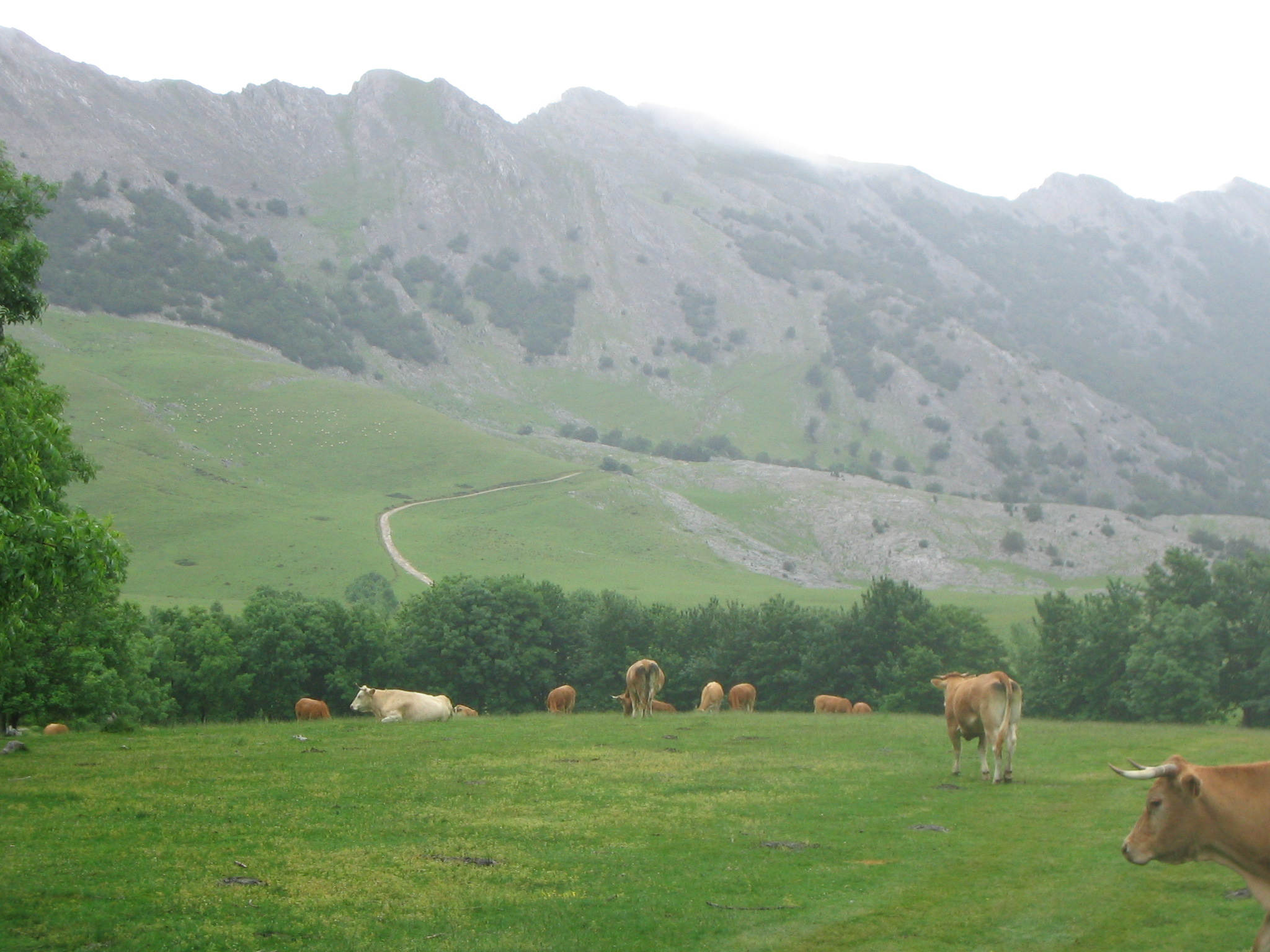
Another view of the Urbia meadows

The mountain range is delimited at either end by the Biozkornia and San Adrian passes. On the one end the massif stretches west to the Aloña massif, on the other one to the Altzania massif (highest summit Aratz). The major Madrid-Irun railway cuts its way through the northern steep slopes of the mountain range, with two train stops, i.e. Otzaurte and Zegama Apeadero hardly operating any longer.

== Access points ==
Nowadays, Zegama Apeadero is well known for providing access to one hard northern trail mounting up rather straight to a central pass by Andreaitz. The initial mud track going up west (PR-GI 70) peters out into a narrow trail at a major crossroads (col of Intzuzaeta) after taking a turn south-west. Signals are abandoned and the trail penetrates straight into an open beech forest, where traces of the trail can go almost unnoticed. At the final stage of the ascension, the path winds up. At this point, autochthonous forest and steep slopes are left behind, yielding to a distinctive karst and grazing landscape.

Yet the main ascension route comes from the south-west, from the Sanctuary of Arantzazu (Oñati), where a beaten trail goes up through a thick forest of beeches and ends at the Urbia meadows. From there, the route climbs up to the summits (Aizkorri, Aketegi, Aitxuri and others). Way-marking will be easily found.

Another access point lies on the east at the San Adrian tunnel and the Medieval road crossing it. At the southern exit of the tunnel, after a 50-metre walk, from a clearing a trail penetrates almost unnoticed up the forest on the right, so beginning a 30-odd minute uphill struggle (not in vain is it dubbed Kalbario Bidea, 'Calvary Trail') with loose pebbles all along. At this point, an opening affords a view onto the north and the trail cuts along the verge of several limestone cliffs on its way north-west. In another 30 minutes, the Aizkorri summit may be attained. A stark refuge hut (built 1934 as a shelter for shepherds and hikers) and the Santo Cristo hermitage lie by the summit.

== Events ==
The Zegama-Aizkorri Marathon, a popular cross-country endurance race, takes place in spring along a loop circuit around the Aizkorri massif (sometimes including Aratz).

Adding to the appeal of the range, the whole Aizkorri and Aratz area was declared the Aizkorri-Aratz Natural Park in 2006.

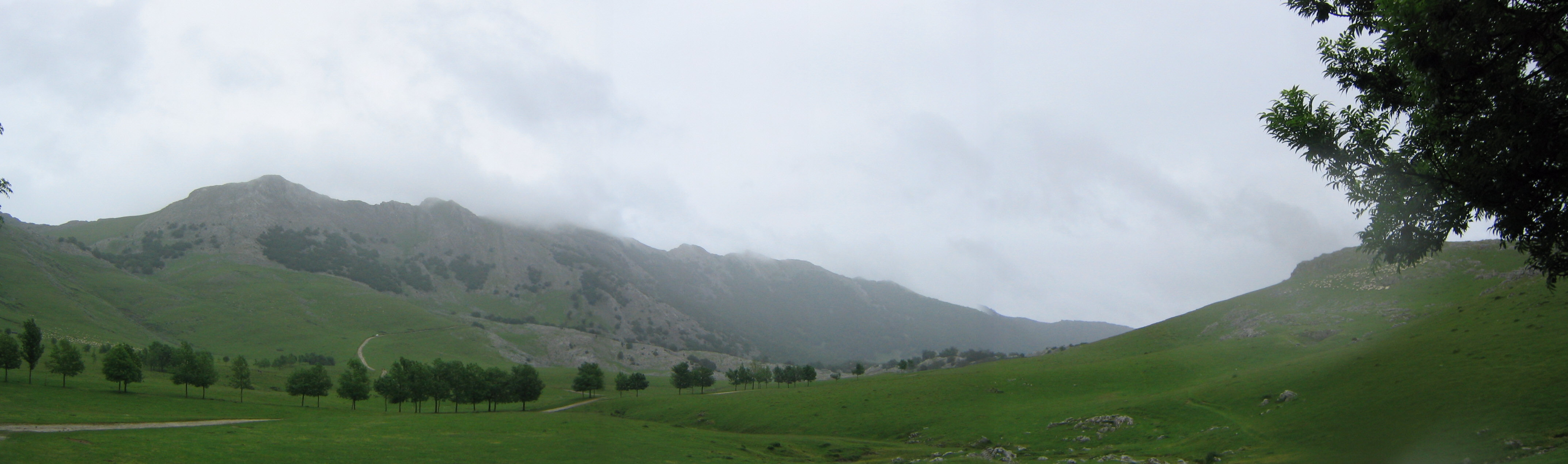
The Aizkorri range from the Urbia meadows

== Gallery ==
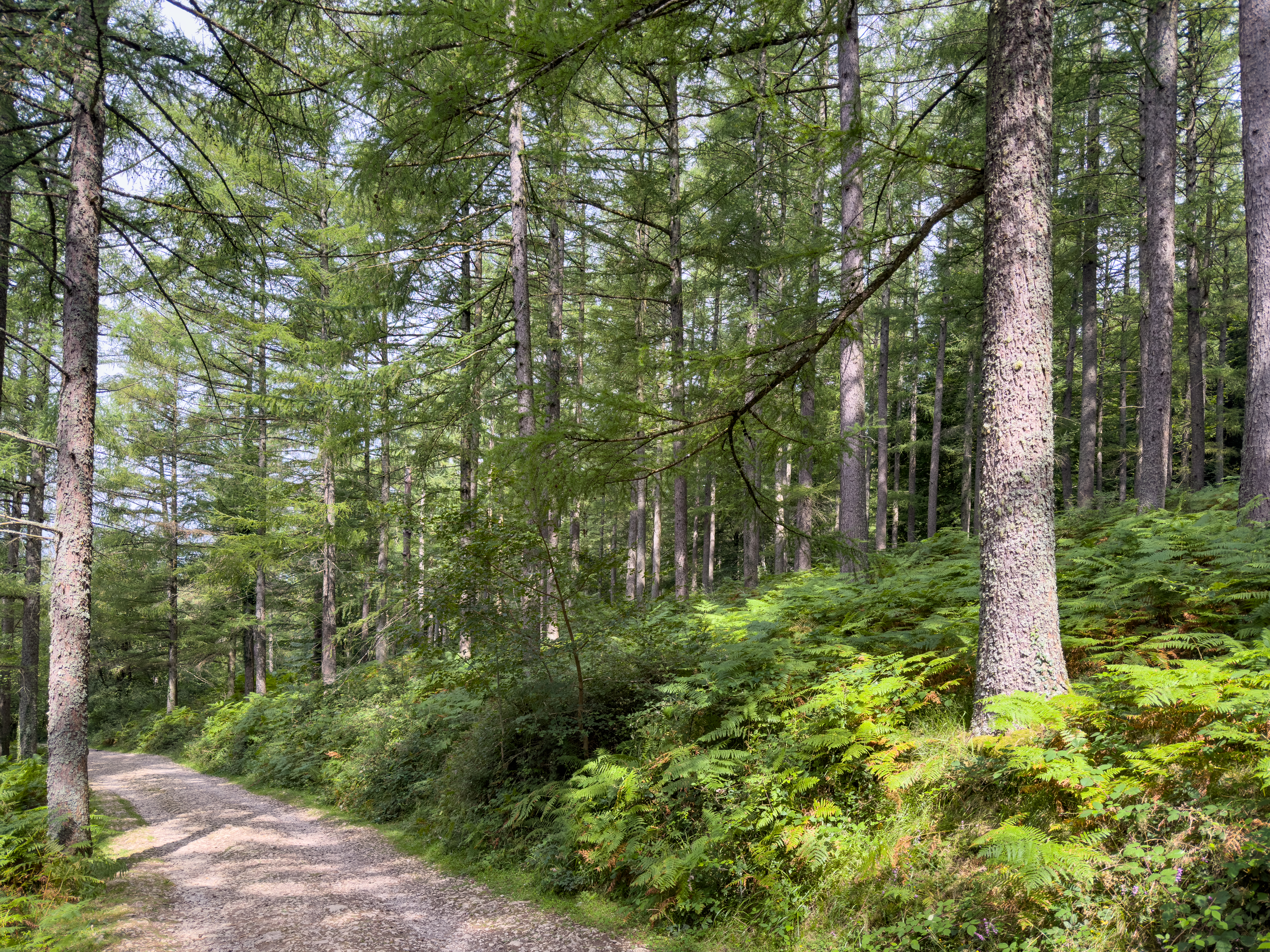

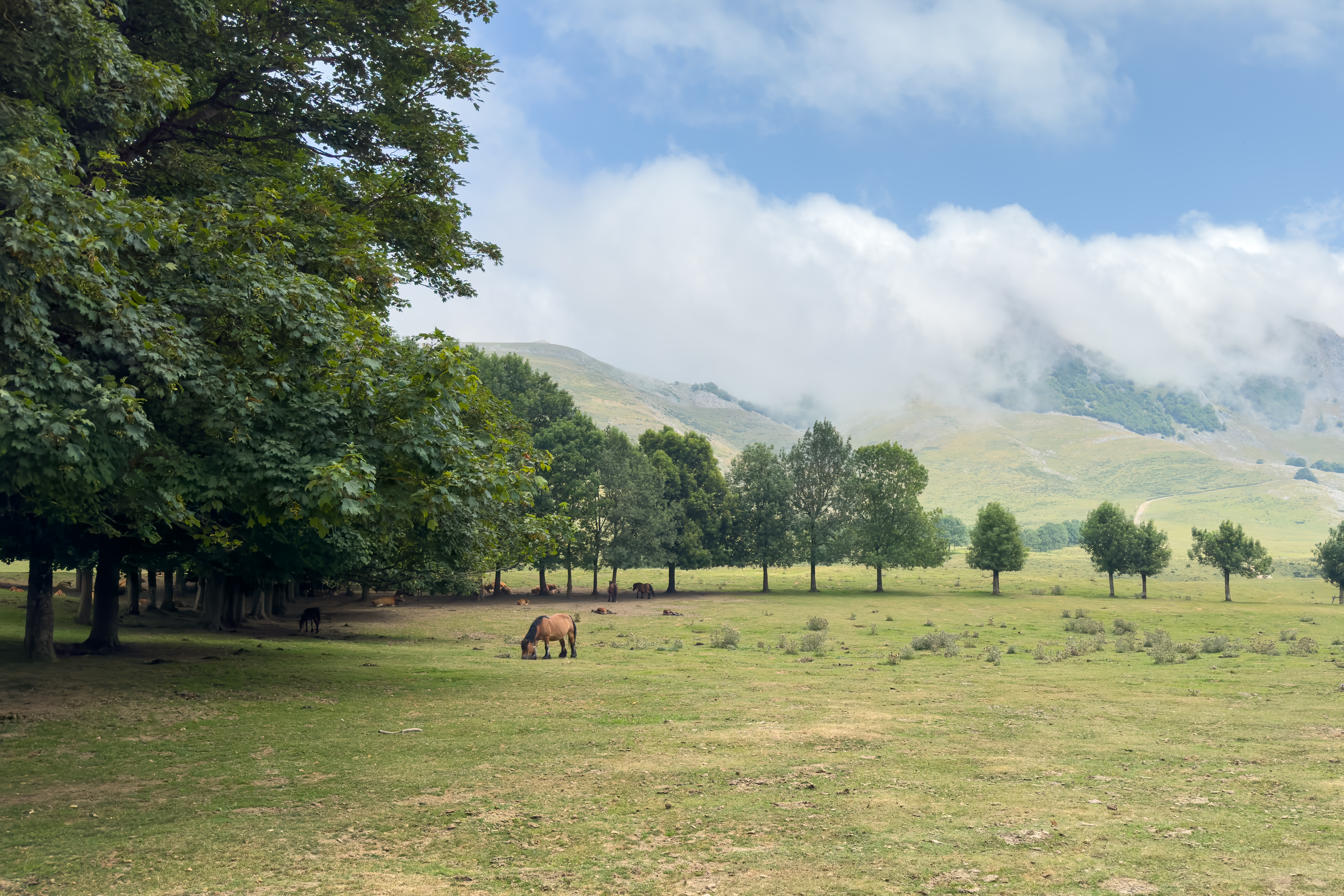

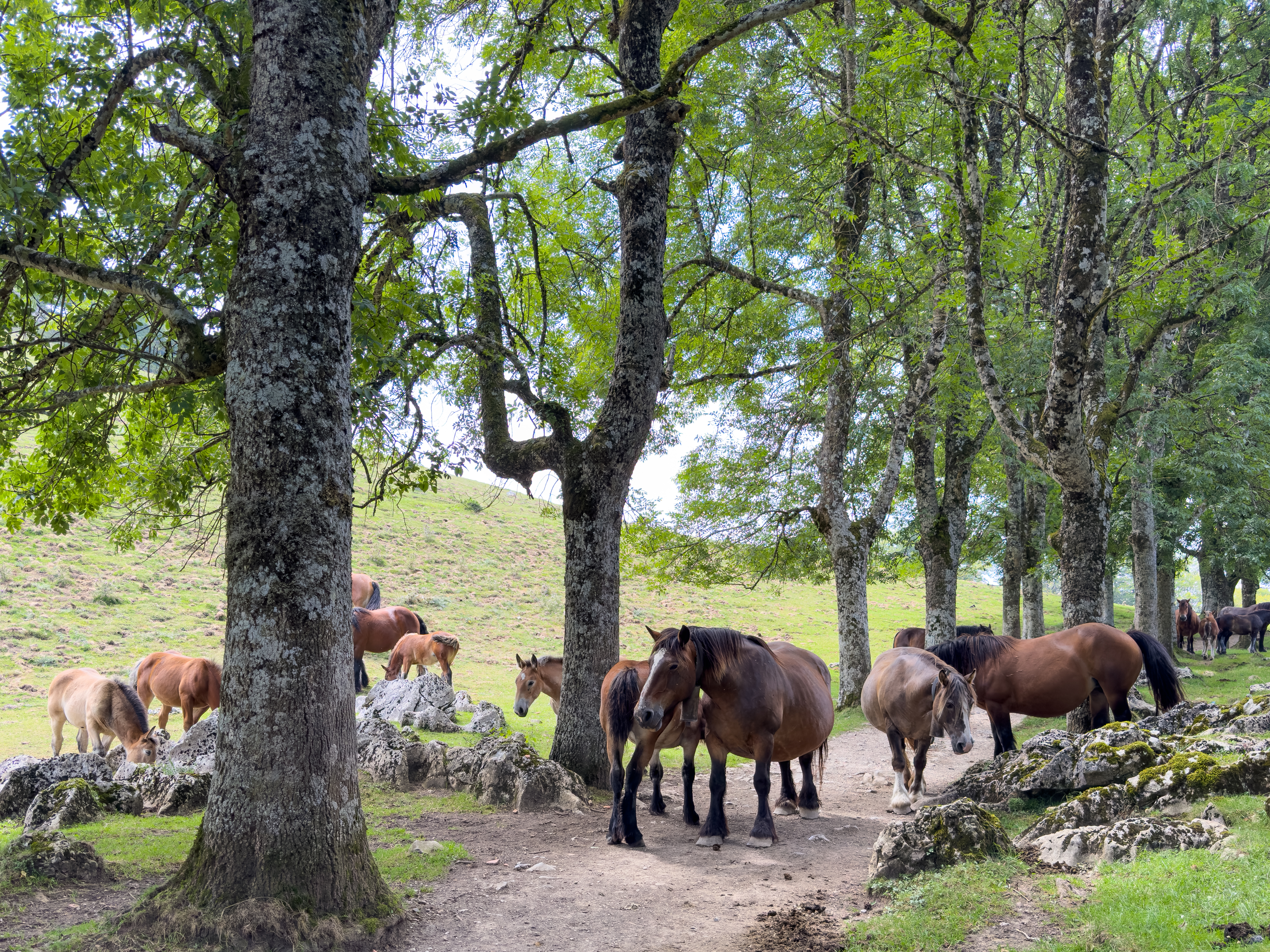

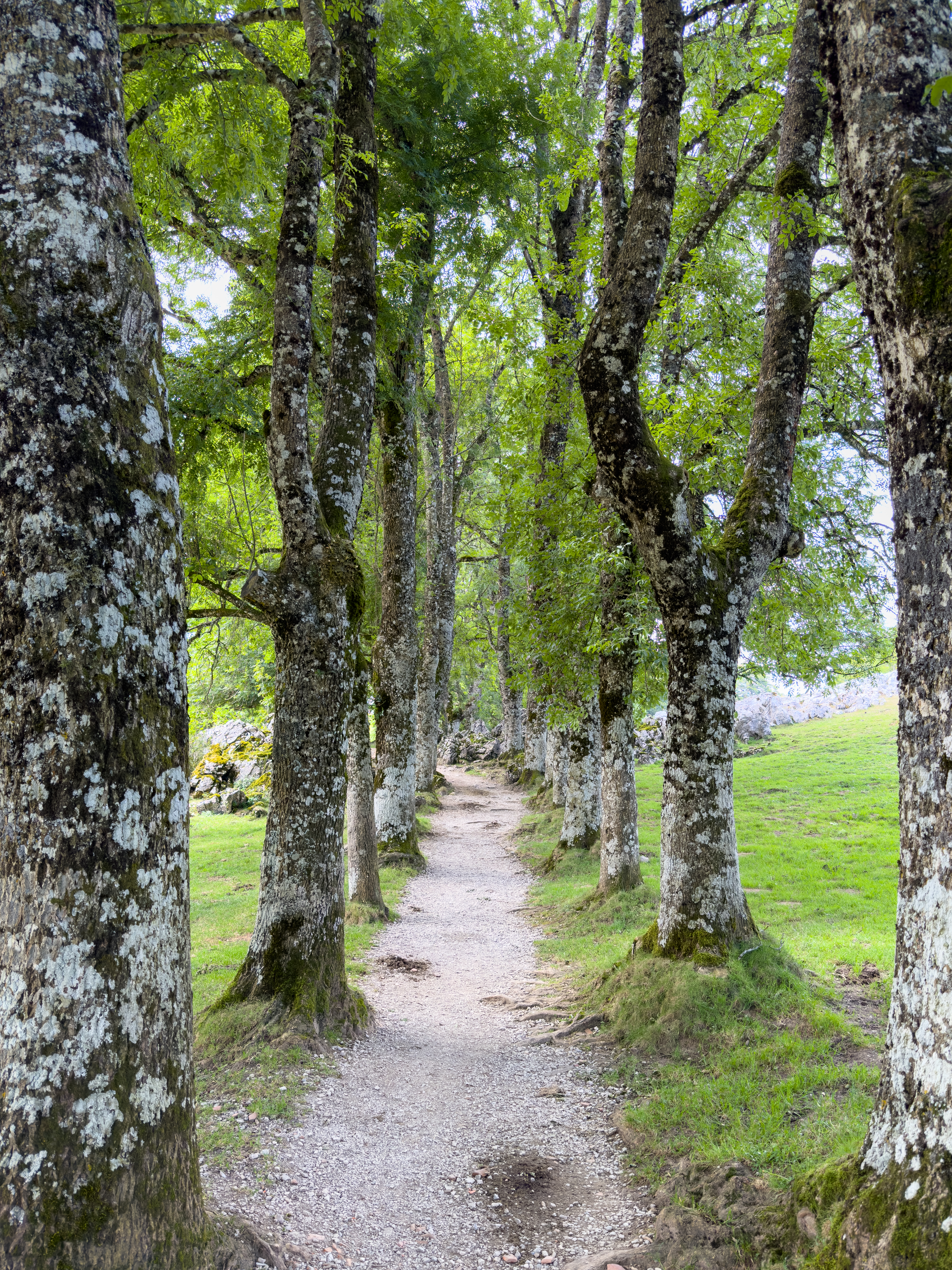

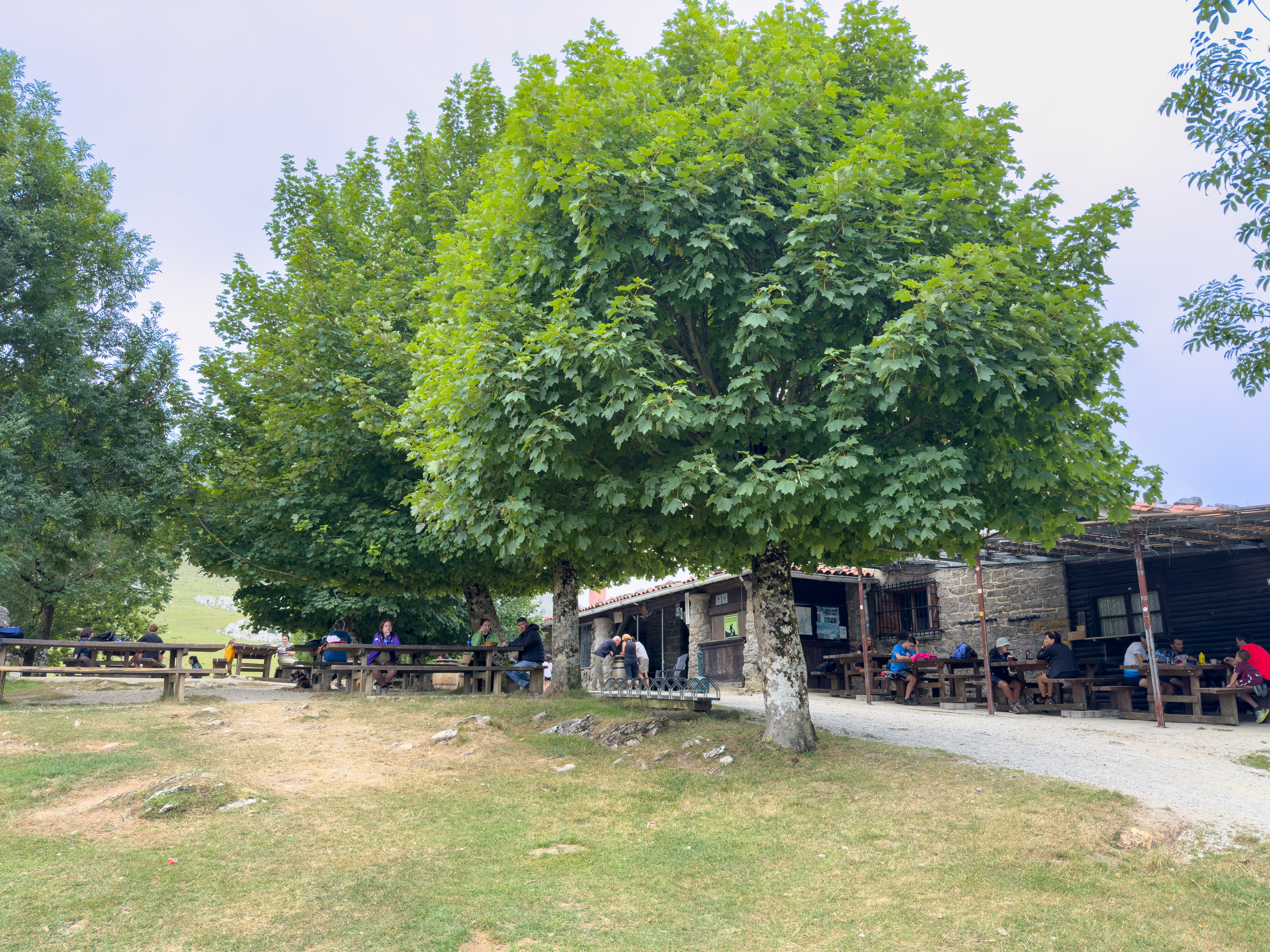

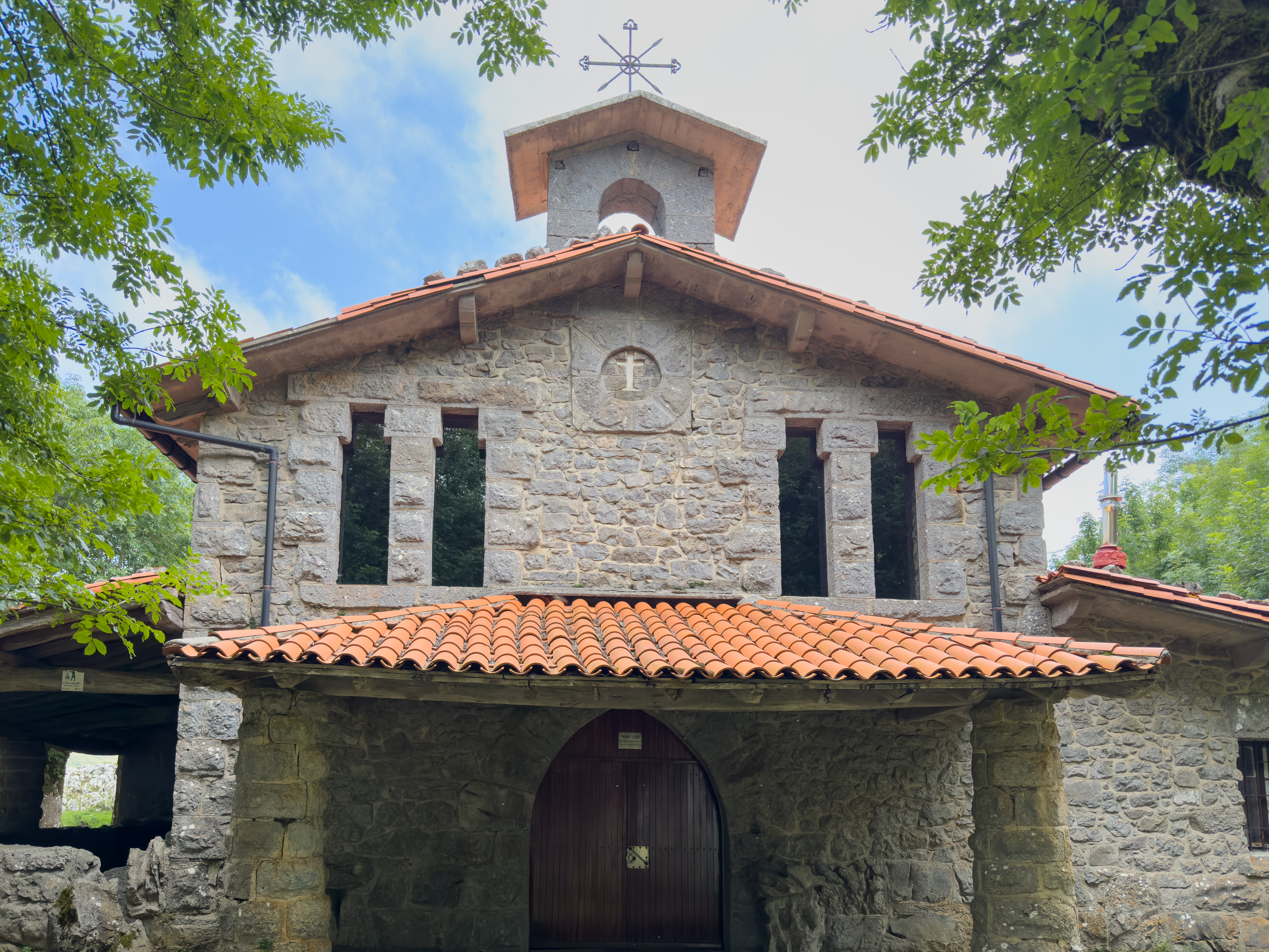
