= Zalduondo =

Village and municipality in Spain

- Municipality
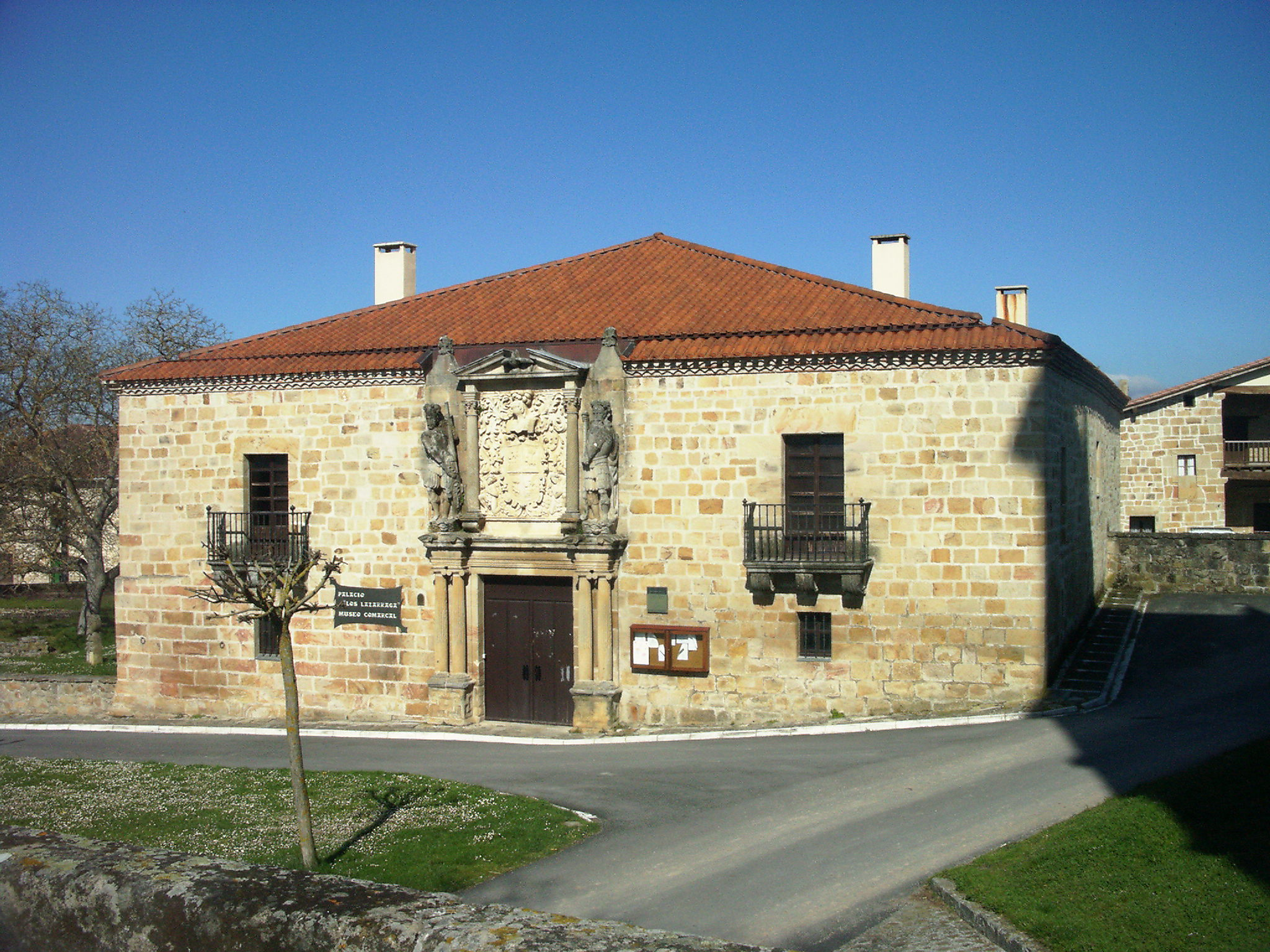

- Location of Zalduondo within the Basque Country
- Coordinates: 42°53′8″N 2°20′49″W
- Country: Spain
- Autonomous Community: Basque Country
- Province: Álava
- Comarca: Llanada Alavesa

Government
  - Mayor: Lurdes Lekuona Laburu

Area
  - Total: 12.03 km^{2} (4.64 sq mi)
- Elevation (AMSL): 608 m (1,995 ft)

Population (2025-01-01)
  - Total: 195
  - Density: 16.2/km^{2} (42.0/sq mi)
- Time zone: UTC+1 (CET)
  - Summer (DST): UTC+2 (CEST (GMT +2))
- Postal code: 01208

Zalduondo is a village and municipality located in the province of Araba (Álava), in the Basque Country (autonomous community), northern Spain. In 2012 the population was 185 persons and the extension of the village is 12,03 km^{2}.
