= Alkiza =

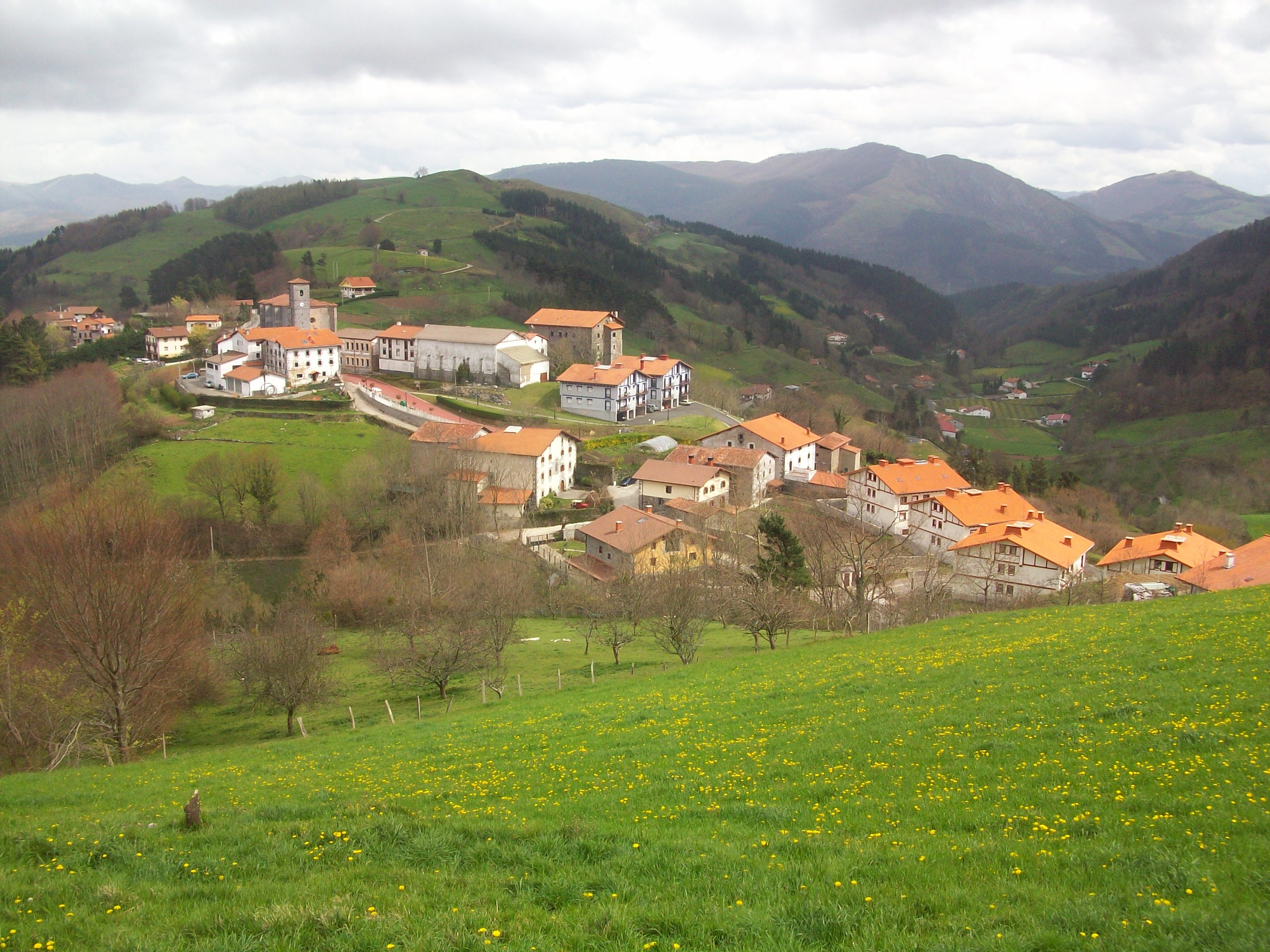
- Alkiza in 2010

- Coat of arms

- Location of Alkiza within the Basque Country Location of Alkiza within Spain
- Coordinates: 43°10′21″N 2°06′32″W
- Country: Spain
- Autonomous community: Basque Country
- Province: Gipuzkoa
- Comarca: Tolosaldea

Government
  - Mayor: Iñaki Irazabalbeitia

Area
  - Total: 11.87 km^{2} (4.58 sq mi)

Population (2025-01-01)
  - Total: 352
  - Density: 29.7/km^{2} (76.8/sq mi)
- Time zone: UTC+1 (CET)
  - Summer (DST): UTC+2 (CEST)
- Postal code: 20494
- Website: www.alkiza.eus

Alkiza is a rural municipality in the centre of Gipuzkoa, northwest of the Tolosaldea County, in the Basque Country. It is 27 kilometres south of San Sebastian. In 2019 it had 373 inhabitants, of which 88.8% were Basque speakers. Alkiza is an independent municipality since 1731; previously it depended on Tolosa and San Sebastian.

Alkiza is connected with Anoeta and Asteasu through the GI-3630 road. The Asteasu branch was inaugurated in 1952 and the Anoeta branch in 1957. Until then, farm roads and paths linked Alkiza with the nearby villages.

The village is 340 meters above sea level and there are the school, the town hall, the pelota-court and the parish church. The municipality has more than 40 scattered farms and houses.

Its inhabitants are nicknamed in Basque oiloak (chickens).

The village's main festival is on September 8.

== Geography ==
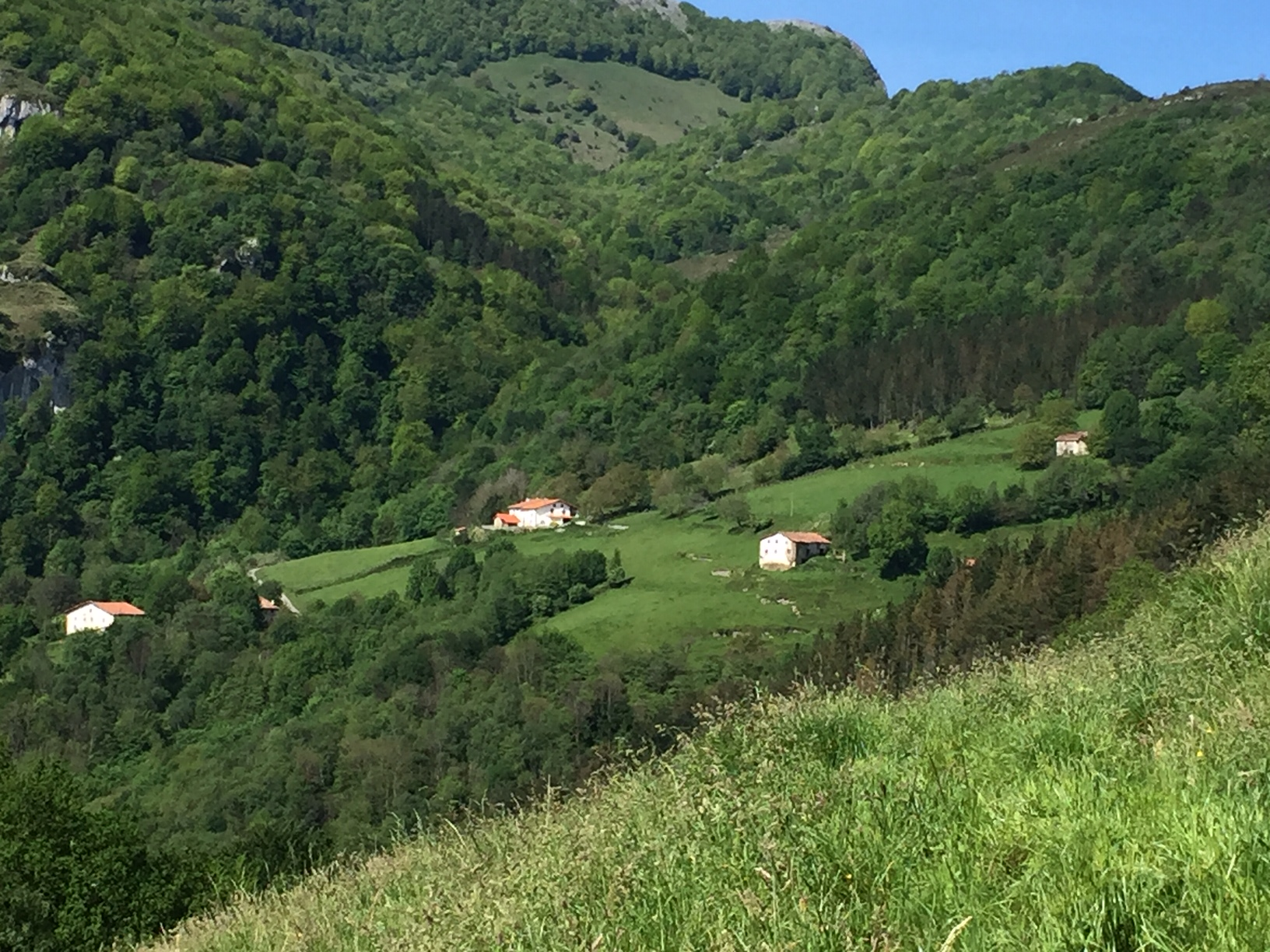
Scattered farmhouses in the steeply neighbourhood of Hernio. In the back, Hernio mount covered with a forest of beeches and mountain prairies.

Alkiza is located in the east of Hernio-Gazume massif. The municipal area is mostly steep, with the flattest area in Arana neighborhood.

The local climate is typically Oceanic.

As Hernio is a limestone formation, there are in Alkiza numerous karst structures such as caves, chasms and sinkholes. The Leize Haundia 2 / Sabe-saia complex is the most important karst structure in Alkiza. The two caves form a system 340 m deep, 2 km of galleries and a stream inside.

The most outstanding summits in the municipality are Herniozabal (1,010 m), Herniotxiki (820 m), Enaizpuru (731 m), Alluts (687 m) and Beleburu (619 m) to the west and Mendiola (431 m) to the east.

A quarter of the surface of Hernio-Gazume Special Conservation Zone (Nature 2000) is located in the municipality of Alkiza.

=== Hydrology ===
As mentioned above, Alkiza is a karst area, so the rain and thaw waters go underground to a large extent. For this reason, some streams and creeks only carry water in the event of intense precipitation and, in others, there are surface waters only in some sections of the course.

There are two main streams in Alkiza:

- Mandabe stream runs through Arana neighborhood and discharges its waters in Anoeta to Oria river. It is born in the source called Bidania erreka, where the waters of the Leize / Haundia 2 / Sabe-saia complex emerge. Among the inhabitants of Alkiza it was thought that the waters of this source came from the other side of Hernio, specifically from the village of Bidania, and hence its name.
- Aranguren stream is born next to the farmhouse of the same name and runs through Aldapa neighborhood. It pours its waters into Asteasu stream, a tributary of Oria river. This stream is called Arraiaga downstream of the Egurrola bridge.

=== Adjacent municipalities ===
Alkiza limits to the north with Larraul and Asteasu; to the south with Hernialde, Tolosa, Albiztur and Bidania-Goiatz; to the east with Anoeta; and to the west with Errezil.

== History ==
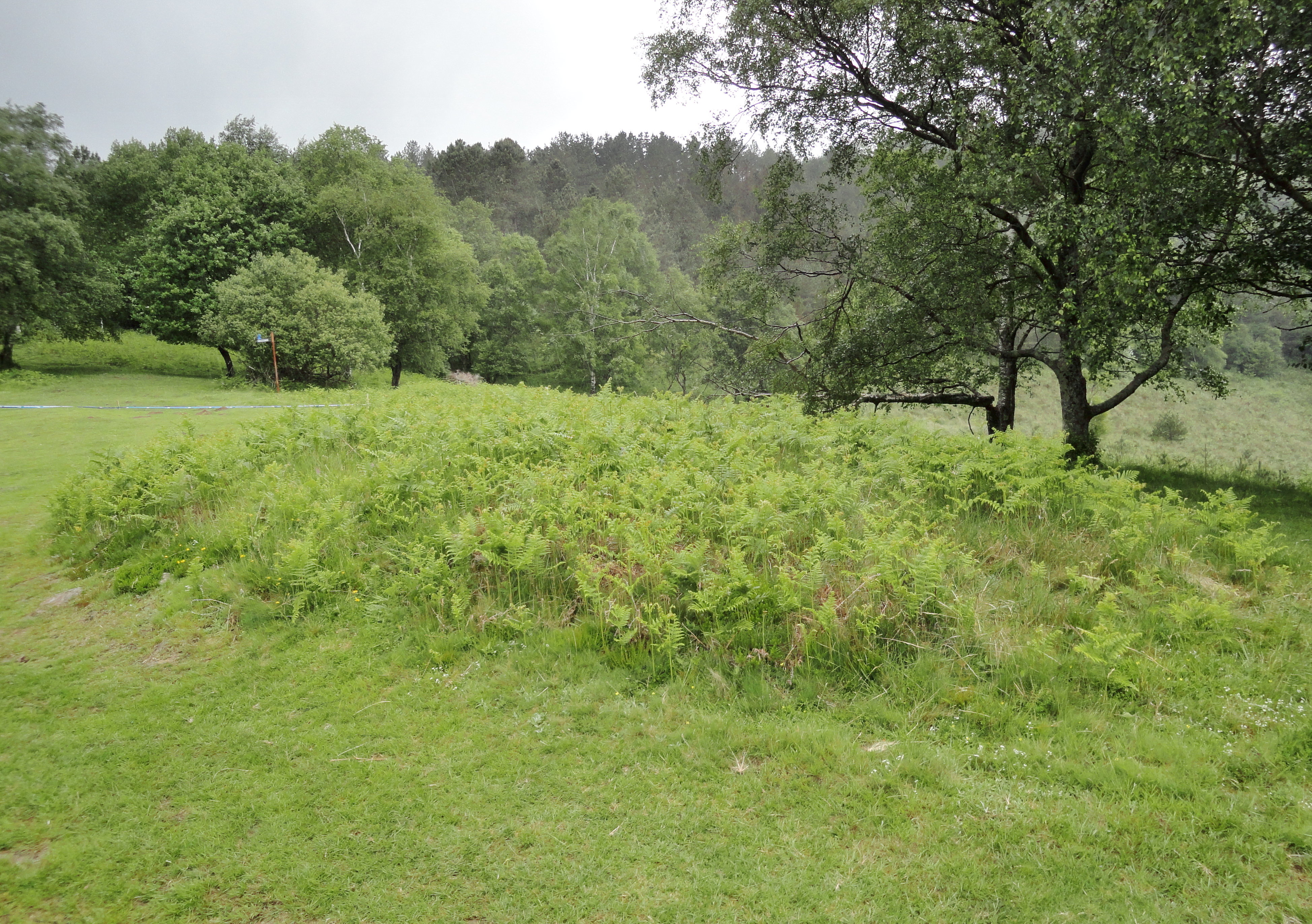
Burial mounf of Itzurain. Bronze Age

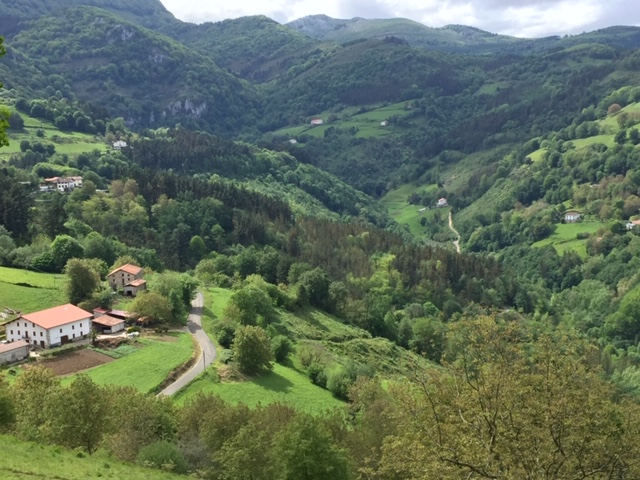
Scattered farmhouses of Aldapa, Azaldegi and Hernio neighbourhoods

The first human footprints in Alkiza date back to the Bronze Age. Ceramic pieces in the Olatzazpi cave and the burial mound of the place called Itzuregi are an example of this.

The first written references to Alkiza are from 1348. In fact, by order of the King of Castile Alfonso XI, the list of noblemen of Tolosa was drawn up. In this list there are several Alkiza households. Alkiza is mentioned administratively associated to Tolosa. In 1396 Tolosa recognized Alkiza the right to choose its judges. Because of taxes Alkiza and other villages of Tolosaldea had disputes with Tolosa since 1435. Within this process, in 1450, Alkiza decided to join San Sebastián, but this did not materialize legally until in 1479.

Between the 15th and 18th centuries, Alkiza self-governed as an open council, although judges and aldermen were also appointed for everyday decisions.

At the end of the first third of the 18th century, the most important moment in the history of Alkiza arrived: it became a municipality. On January 21, 1731, Alkiza was declared a villa by King Philip V and separated from San Sebastián. The distance to San Sebastián was the most important reason to carry out this secession. Miguel Irazusta was the first mayor. That same year, the limits of Alkiza with the villages in the area were officially defined and each of the cairns was signalled. The Asteasu boundary, for example, was delimited by the cairns of Olatza, Arizmendi, Zalminaga and Arraiaga. 54 houses constituted the new municipality.

By becoming an independent municipality, Alkiza acquired the right to participate in the General Assembly of Gipuzkoa. This had an economic cost and Alkiza proposed Anoeta to join and to share expenses. In 1742 the two villages founded the Ainssu union for their representation in the General Assembly. In 1815 Hernialde joined Ainssu and the enlarged union was called Ainssuberreluz.

At the beginning of the 19th century, the communal land was privatized in Alkiza. The first movement occurred because of the debts derived from the War of the Convention, and so in 1797 the local assembly authorized the City Council to sell communal land. The first auction of communal land was held in 1799 and the City Council sold 53 lots. From that date until 1814 the City Council held six auctions for the alienation of communal land. In 1810, other goods were auctioned, such as the Olaa and Goiko Errota mills in Aldapa neighborhood and Igaran in Arana neighborhood. At the end of the 18th century, half of the municipality's land was public and between 1799 and 1845 the City Council auctioned 682 communal plots, 5.3 km^{2}. The communal land was reduced to an area of 0.4 km^{2}.

This privatization seriously affected the economy of the city council. In fact, the council obtained great economic resources by selling firewood, charcoal, chestnuts and others. This caused, for example, in 1801 the loss of the resident notaries that Alkiza had since 1749. The forest guards responsible for the municipal forests and nurseries also disappeared.

The two Carlist wars of the 19th century had little effect on Alkiza. Although, in the Third Carlist War, the so-called Alkiza encounter happened in 1873. The Carlist guerrilla leader Santa Cruz priest was suspected to be somewhere in Hernio area and the miqueletes (police corp) and the liberal troops went looking for him. They found no one and decided to descend from Zelatun pass to Alkiza. Upon entering the village they were greeted with shots, but the liberals expelled the Carlists carrying a charge in bayonet. On the other hand, it was frequent that Santa Cruz took shelter in the priest's house of Alkiza, whose parish priest was a fervent Carlist.

The mail service started in 1873 with two postmen. One of them made the Azpeitia-Alquiza-Larraul-Asteasu route and the other, Tolosa-Alquiza-Larraul-Asteasu.

In 1885 the city council decided to bring up the telegraph and telephone to the village. These services were based in the municipal tavern. The phone was not extended to all households in the municipality until the beginning of the decade of 1980.

In 1911 four local entrepreneurs built a hydroelectric power station in the course of Mandabe stream. In this way, households of Alkiza were supplied with electric power. This plant was a pioneer of the current Elektralkiza hydroelectric power station. Alkiza was supplied with electrical energy produced by Mandabe stream until 1971 when the Spanish large power company Iberduero installed two transformation centers in the municipality. The first motorcar arrived in Alkiza on November 2, 1930.

== Administrative organization ==
In 1775 the City Council issued a decree that organized the collection of fern, dead leaves, and the like for the livestock beddings from the communal land. In it, the municipality was divided into four neighbourhoods: Azaldegi, Aldapa, Arana Behea and Arana Goikoa.

At the time the quotas for the payment of the local doctor were established in 1847, the municipality was divided again into four neighbourhoods: Azaldegi, Aldapa, Arana and Herriburua. In 1884 Aldapa neighbourhood was divided into two: Aldapa and Hernio. Sakamidra neighbourhood was set up in 1940, bringing together several farmhouses from Arana and Azaldegi.

In addition to the urban nucleus, called Plaza by the neighbours, Alkiza is currently officially divided into five neighbourhoods: Aldapa (it borders Larraul), Arana (flat area on the Anoeta road), Azaldegi (on both sides of the road to Asteasu), Hernio (at the foot of Hernio) and Sakamidra (adjacent to Goi-bailara neighbourhood of Anoeta).

== Demography ==
At the time the first written documentation about Alkiza appeared, that is to say in the 14th century, it is estimated that it had about 60 inhabitants; at the beginning of the 17th century there were around 230 and when it established as a municipality, about 270. At the beginning of the 19th century, more than 350 people lived in Alkiza. The first exact data on the number of inhabitants are from the mid-19th century.

Evolution of the population of Alkiza since 1851

Year	Pop.	±%
1851	648	—
1860	611	−5.7%
1900	522	−14.6%
1920	476	−8.8%
1940	494	+3.8%
1960	401	−18.8%

Year	Pop.	±%
1970	341	−15.0%
1981	272	−20.2%
1991	264	−2.9%
2000	254	−3.8%
2011	365	+43.7%
2020	373	+2.2%

Since the beginning of the 20th century, the population has been decreasing gradually, a decrease that accelerated from the 1960s to the end of the century. The number of inhabitants reached the minimum in 2000, with only 254. At the beginning of the 21st century, the population of Alquiza was comparable to the one it had when it became a municipality. This has a simple explanation from the point of view of the economic and family structure of the municipality. From the middle of the 20th century, agriculture ceased to be the engine of the local economy. The alkizarras began to go to work in both industry and services located in nearby towns such as Asteasu, Anoeta or Tolosa. At the same time the large families the rural economy needs began to shrink, from six to seven offspring to just two or three.

== Economy ==
Until the middle of the 20th century, agriculture and related activities such as blacksmithing or watermills were Alkiza's main economic activities.

Agrarian activity was organized around the farm and it was largely a subsistence economy. They used to live on what the farm produced. Unlike in other Gipuzkoan regions, it doesn't seem that shepherding had a great weight in the economy of the Alkiza farms.

Alkiza has historically three mills: Igaran, in Arana neighbourhood on Mandabe stream, and Olaa and Goiko Errota in Aldapa neighbourhood on Aranguren stream. These last two mills were active until 1953. Corn and wheat were ground.

In the 16th century, the Egurrola forge had increased activity between 1511 and 1615. The forge were destroyed by a large flood.

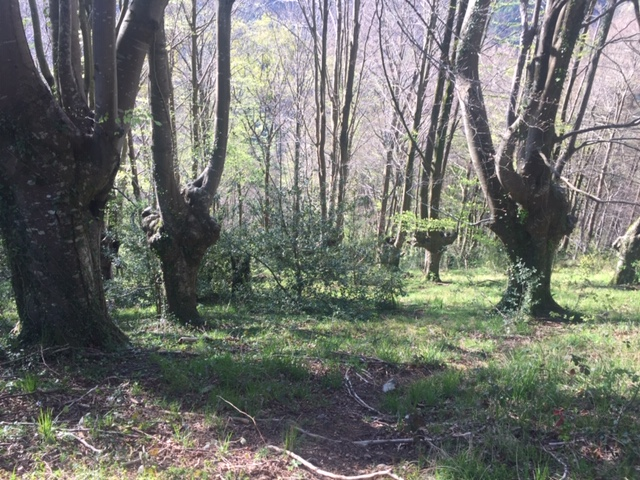
Forest of pollarded beech trees, that were planted purposely to obtain wood for both fire and coalbunkers.

Charcoal was an important monetary supplement for the farmers of Alkiza, who sold it to the industry and homes in nearby municipalities such as Tolosa. Wood from the forests of Hernio is a very suitable raw material for the manufacture of charcoal. This activity shaped the structure of Alkiza's forests, resulting in many pollarded beech trees. This activity survived until the early 1960s. In the 1950s, a dozen and a half charcoal bunkers could be lit at the same time.

Between 1945 and 1950 a group of entrepreneurs, including the mayor of Alkiza, Mateo Aranburu, built a system of cables, pulleys and posts used to take down beech wood from the forests of Hernio to the Konporta farmhouse in Asteasu. This wood was sold to bakeries and used to cook bread.

In the last decades of the 20th century, Alkiza had a small industrial estate next to the Umanea neighbourhood of Asteasu, which is no longer active. Baldosas Jarri was the main local company.

At present, Alkiza has a very weak economic activity of its own and the locals work mainly outside the municipality, mainly in the industry and services of the region. There is a presence of a significant group of university professors among the residents of Alkiza. In 2020, two farms, the Lete rural hotel, Inazio Urruzola Txakoli winery, the municipal restaurant, Elektralkiza mini hydroelectric plant and a sharpening company make up the productive fabric of Alkiza.

== Politics ==
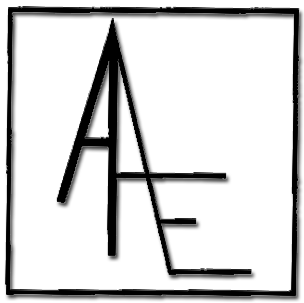
Alkizako Abertzale Ezkertiarrak

Since Alkiza became an independent municipality citizens got the right of electing the mayor. As mentioned above, the first mayor was Miguel de Irazusta, an alkizarra architect based in Madrid. The municipal ordinances established that the successive mayors had to reside in the town, in such a way that Jerónimo Alkizalete succeeded Irazusta. Until the mid-nineteenth century, mayors were elected in the first days of the calendar year and to be candidates they had to be noblemen and first-class farmhouse owners. They were chosen for one year, although there are some exceptions, for example, Gregorio Arantzabe was chosen for 1808 and 1809.

In 1845, after the First Carlist War, the electoral system changed and, among other things, the mandate of the mayors was prolonged.

In 1931, in the municipal elections that led to the proclamation of the Second Spanish Republic, Krispin Sorarrain was elected mayor until 1934. José Tolosa followed. On August 27, 1936, after the Spanish Civil War broke out, the Junta de Burgos, authority faithful to the coup plotters, proceeded to dismiss José Tolosa and the other councilors: Krispin Sorarrain, José Luis Iruretagoiena and Simón Ugalde, and to appoint as mayor, Matías Aranburu. At the end of the Franco regime, in the first municipal elections (1979), Bittor Sorarrain Lasa, nephew of Krispin, was elected mayor standing in the independent list Alkizako Herriaren Alde. Antonio Zubiaurre Otegi was mayor of Alkiza from 1983 until his death in 2004, on behalf of Euskadiko Ezkerra first and of the independent list Alkizako Abertzale Ezkertiarrak (Alkiza's National Left) since 1995. In 2004 Jon Roteta took possession of the mayor's office and remained in office until 2011. In the 2011 and 2015 elections, Jon Umérez Urrezola was elected mayor and Inaki Irazabalbeitia Fernández in the 2019 elections. Since 1995, all the municipal elected officials in Alkiza have been elected in the list of Alkizako Abertzale Ezkertiarrak.

In the elections to the General Assembly of Gipuzkoa, the Basque Parliament, the Cortes and the European Parliament, the vote for Basque national lists easily exceeds 80% of the votes cast.

== Education ==
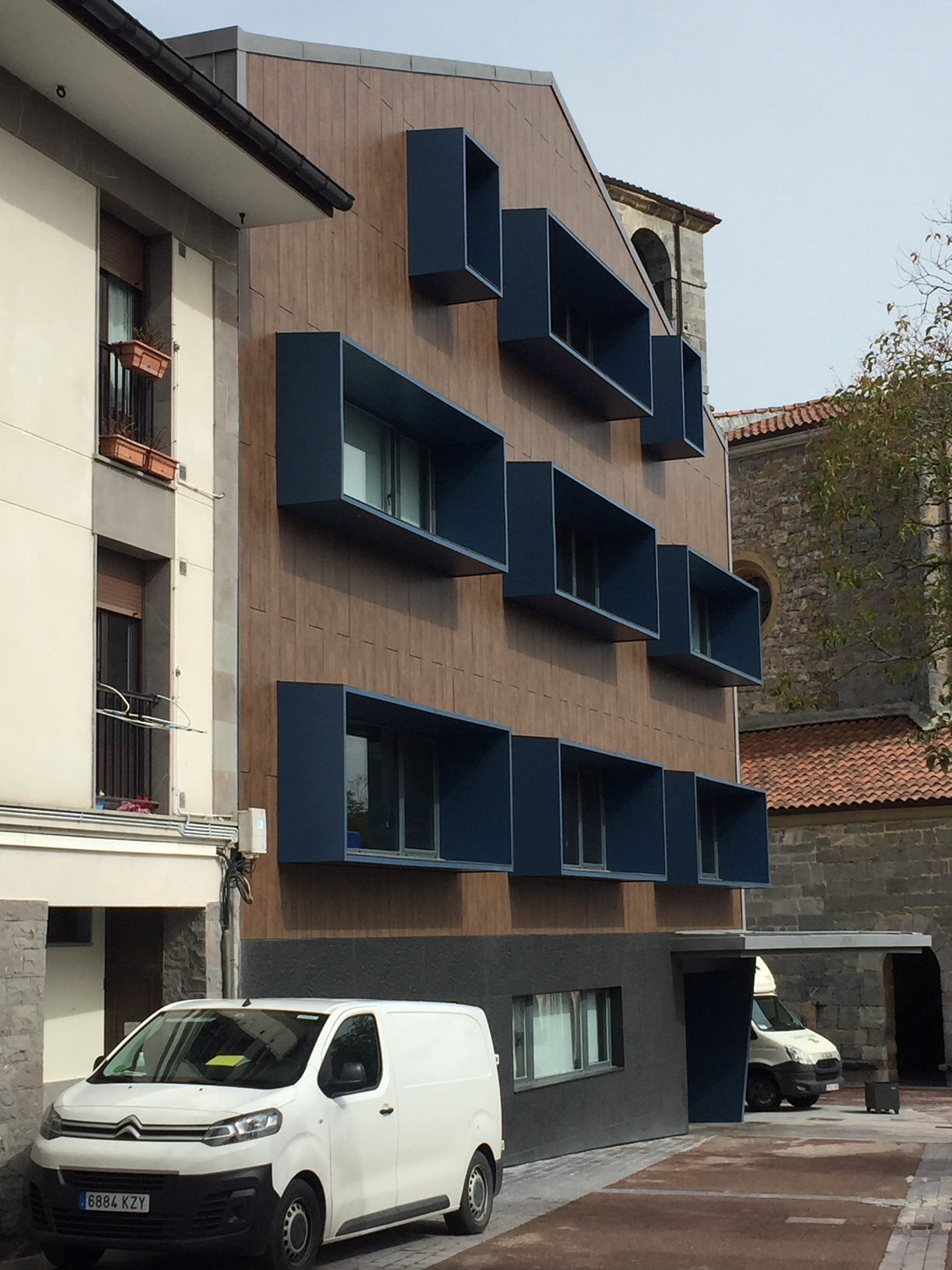
New school building, 2020

Shortly after being declared town, Alkza's city council decided to take care of the education of its inhabitants. In 1749, in the agreement with the first resident notary of the town, Francisco Ignacio Larrunbide, it is mentioned that said notary had to teach reading and writing as well.

This was so until 1797 when the city council appointed the first teacher who was not a notary: Juan Antonio Irazusta. The agreement that he signed with the city council details his obligations and rights: to teach children Christian doctrine and to read, write and count. Except in the case of poor families, all families had to pay in wheat to the teacher who also received the salary stipulated by the city council. At that epoch the school was located at the council building. The teacher also had the function of keeping the clock on the church tower.

In 1816 the brothers and neighbours of the town Juan Bautista and José Antonio Legarra had Migelena house rebuilt. The school was moved to that house and the parish priest Juan Bautista Legarra served as a teacher between 1822 and 1843. In addition to the teacher, a mistress was appointed to teach the girls. The first of them, between 1823 and 1846, was Juana María Aranburu. In his will, Juan Bautista Legarra ceded to the municipality the school building, already known as Donjuanena, for use as a school.

The school stayed at Donjuanena until 1930 when a new one was built on the plot of Madrigal house.

In March 2020, a new building was opened for use by the Basque Government Department of Education, which comes to replace the old one that had become small and out-dated. Alkiza's school offers preschool and primary education. Pupils older than 12 go mainly to Villabona or Tolosa for secondary education.

== Language ==
According to data from 2016, in Alkiza 88.8% of the population can speak Basque language and the social use of the language is 83.6% (2017). At the school, Basque is the vehicular language for teaching.

The municipality is member of the Commonwealth of Basque-speaking Municipalities (UEMA) since December 2019.

Tolosaldea variant of the Gipuzkoan dialect of Basque is spoken, but as a consequence of the use of Standard Basque in both education and media and the more frequent interactions with speakers of other dialects, younger generations have a more hybrid speech.

At Ahotsak portal there are recordings of 8 persons, 5 men and 3 women born between 1917 and 1941, which are samples of the traditional Basque variant spoken in Alkiza.

== Culture ==
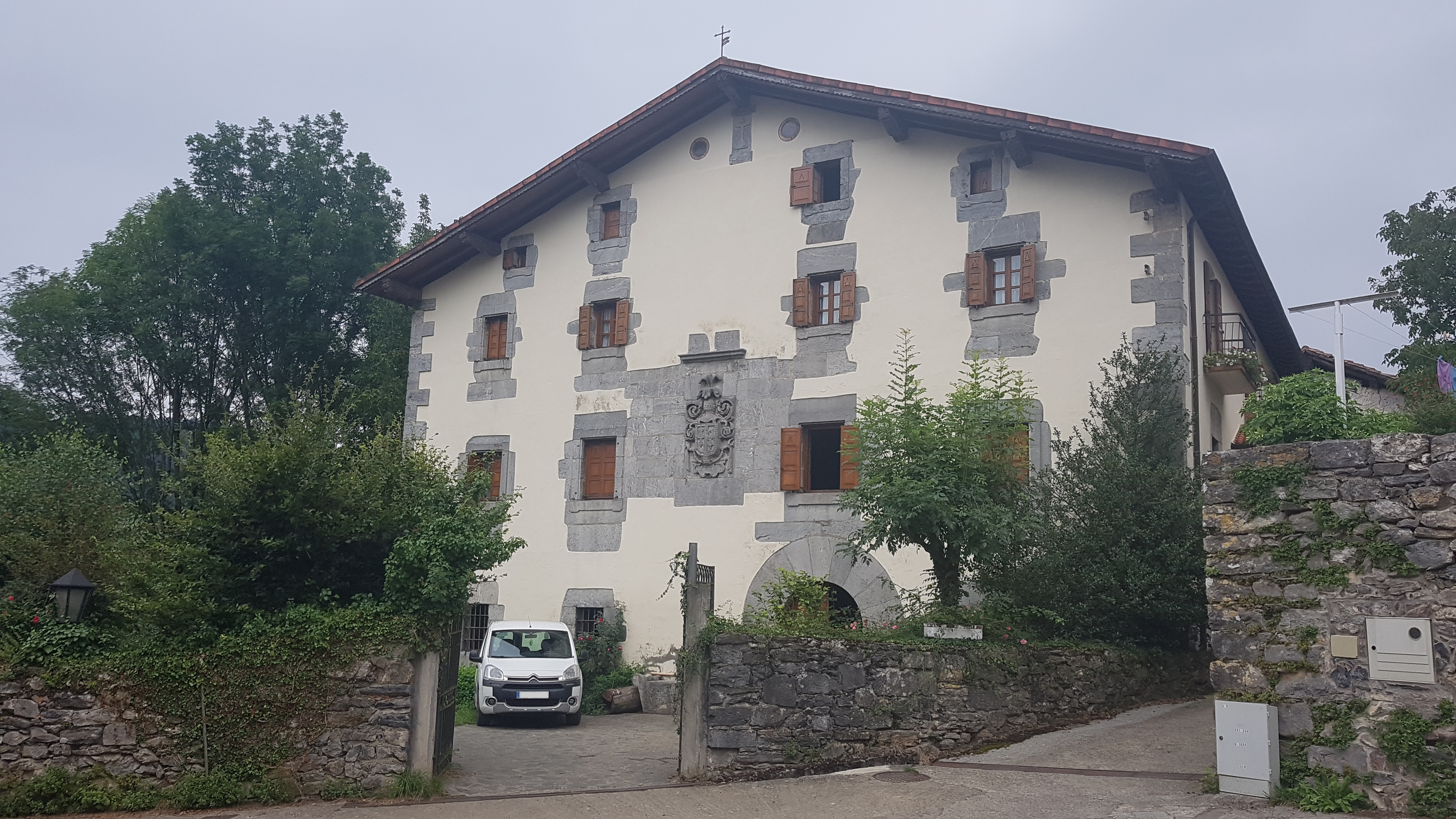
(Alkiza) Lete manor

Alkiza is a municipality of great cultural activity. Throughout the year multiple cultural activities such as lectures, musical performances, exhibitions or theatre are organized. Two cultural weeks are also organized, one in San Isidro (May) and the other in San Martín (November).

On the other hand, between 2008 and 2010 residents developed a cultural project called Itxurain, whose objective was to collect the socio-ethnographic and cultural heritage of the village and to project it towards the future as one of the pillars of the community's identity. A total of 4 projects were carried out with the participation of the school and dozens of residents.

Sormenaren Kabia (Nest for Creativity) initiative has been running since 2018. Every year it offers to two artists a grant, an artistic creation space and the advice of Koldobika Jauregi local sculptor during their stay in Alkiza.

The Ur Mara open-air museum, stand by the road to Asteasu. The sculptor Koldobika Jauregi and his wife, the jewellery designer Elena Cajarabille, manage it. In it, in addition to the work of Koldobika and Elena, it also gathers that of other artists. It also offers an annual program of concerts, exhibitions and workshops.

The painter Juan Luis Goenaga has his workshop in Aritzategibarrena farmhouse in Hernio neighbourhood.

== Monuments ==
=== Lete manor ===
Lete, formerly Alkizalete, is a manor of medieval origin and cradle of Alkizalete lineage one of the most wealthy families in Alkiza till of the 19th century. It has a semicircular arch and gothic-style ground floor panels, as well as pillars and wooden beams from the 16th century. The date of 1212 is engraved on the coat of arms of the façade. The current house is a baroque building from the 18th century.

=== Parish of San Martin de Tours ===
The parish church of San Martin de Tours is Gothic in style and it acquired its current form in the second half of the 16th century. The original building lacked a tower that was built in the 17th century.

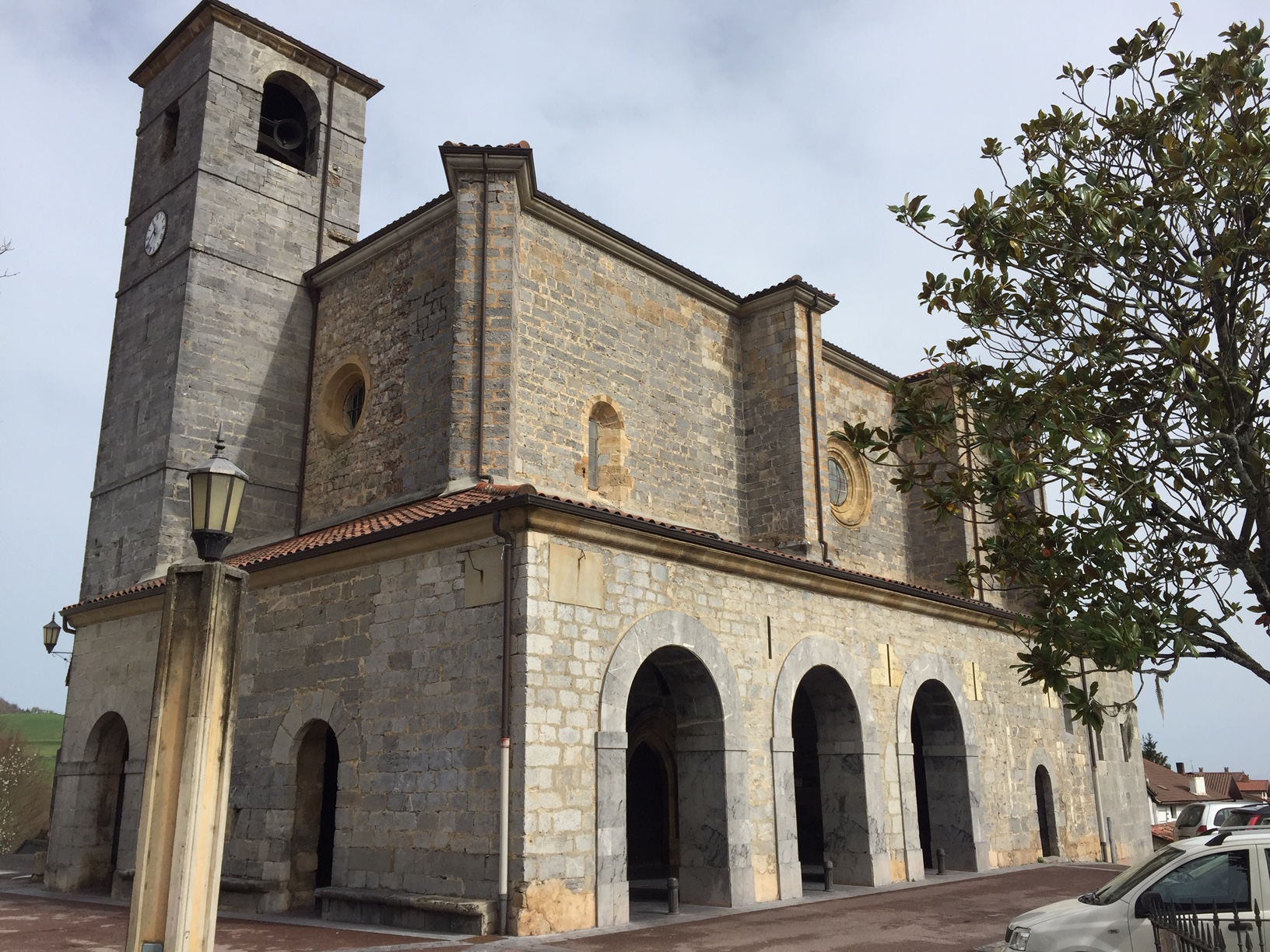
Parish of San Martín de Tours

The original altarpiece of the church has been historically attributed by some experts to the well-known sculptor Joanes Antxeta. However, new data showed that the author was the sculptor Joanes de Arbeiza. Anyway, it is documented that Antxeta was called to Alkiza on the issue of the altarpiece; the main hypothesis being that he only worked as a consultant.

From that same time is the tabernacle of the church, the work is of the local sculptor Ambrosio Bengoetxea. It is currently housed in the Diocesan Museum of San Sebastián, where it was brought to be restored in the early 1980s.

The tower and sacristy of the church were built between 1688 and 1700.

The current altarpiece of the church is the work of Miguel de Irazusta, a local architect based in Madrid. He received the order in 1724 and ended it with his appointment as the town's first mayor. At the time of the parish priest Juan de Irazusta, Miguel's cousin, between 1755 and 1772, some significant improvements were made in the church: the choir arch, the new church floor and the portico were built and a clock was installed in the tower. This clock was reformed in 1841 and 1932.

The church organ dates from 1928.

Between 1998 and 2000 the church of San Martín underwent a profound restoration that was partly financed with funds from the European Union.

=== Hermitages of Santiago and the Holly Cross ===
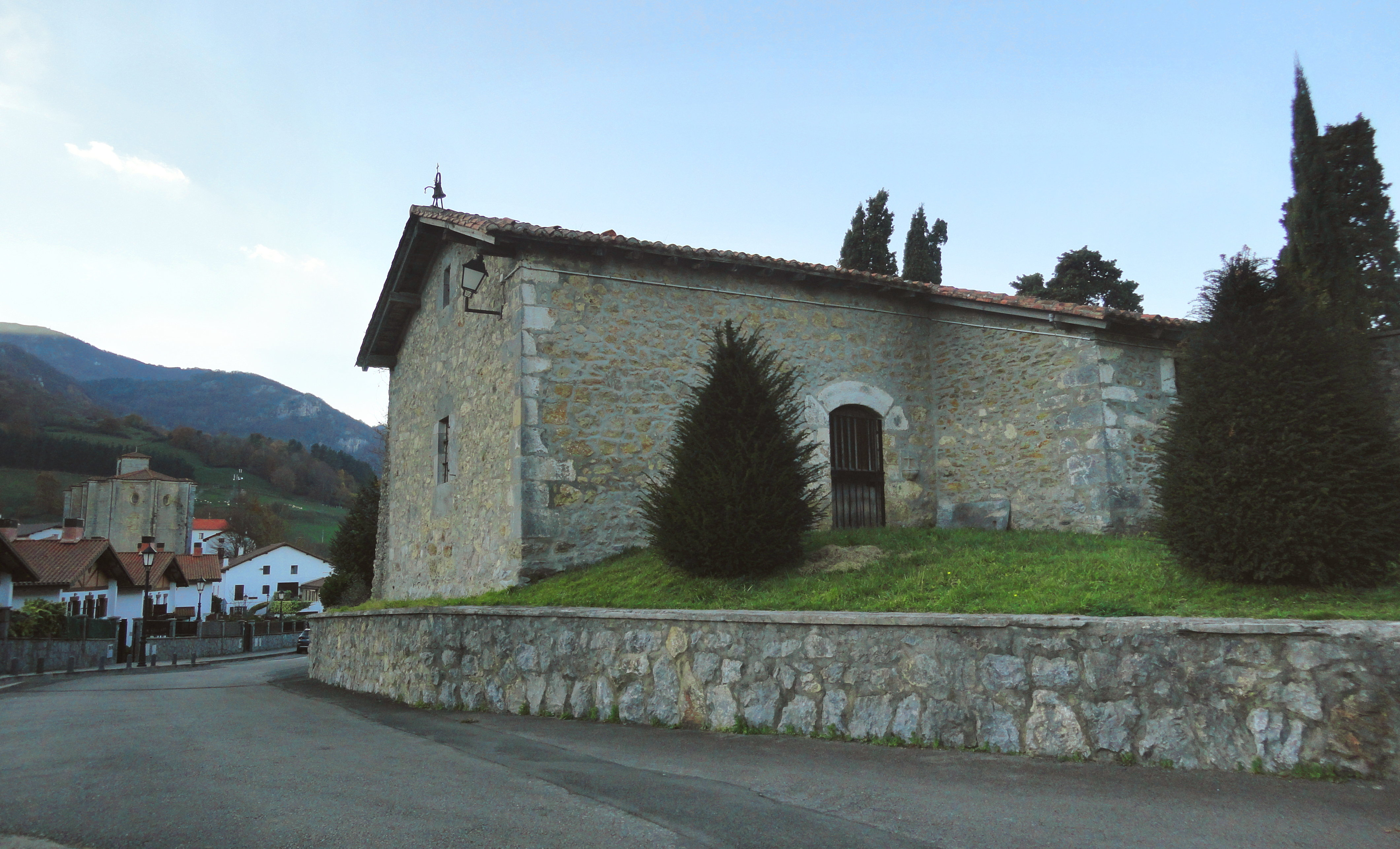
Hermitage of Santiago

There are no data on the construction date of the hermitage of Santiago. Currently, it forms a complex with the cemetery, next to the local car park. In old documentas it has also been called as hospital. The first documented mention of the hermitage dates from 1528. The fact that the hermitage was called hospital as well, encouraged Luis Pedro Peña Santiago to speculate that one of the branches of the Camino de Santiago might have passed through Alkiza.

It was quite common for the residents of Alkiza to make donations to the hermitage in their wills. On the other hand, in 1762 the parish of San Martín commissioned the architect Martín Carrera to build a calvary from the church to the hermitage. There is no data on when it was built, but currently half a dozen crosses are still standing.

A few years after the commission to Carrera, on June 22, 1771, the bishopric of Pamplona prohibited giving mass in the hermitage because it was in a precarious architectural situation. This prohibition lasted until 1832. That same year the bishopric authorized the restoration of the hermitage since the decision had been made to demolish the other hermitage in the village, the hermitage of The Holly Cross

Masses were celebrated in the hermitage of Santiago until 1977 and the procession of Good Friday from the parish and to the hermitage continued until 1979. Currently the hermitage is desacralized.

The hermitage of The Holly Cross stood half an hour away from the urban nucleus and at 520 m above sea level. The old path from Alkiza to Hernio passes by its ruins. The first documented mention of this hermitage dates from 1528. In 1832 the demolition of the hermitage was authorized by the bishopric of Pamplona, alleging that it was far from the urban nucleus and that it had some fallen walls.

=== Cemetery ===
Until the beginning of the XVIII century the dead were buried in San Martín's church. The cemetery itself was built in 1708 next to the hermitage of Santiago. For more than a century the dead were buried, interchangeably, in the parochial church or in the cemetery. From 1828, the cemetery has been used exclusively for burials.

The parish managed the cemetery until 1885 when the city council invested 550 pesetas for its extension. From that year the city council has managed the infrastructure. In 1945 the cemetery was expanded and acquired the current configuration.

In February 1926, the bones of the buried in San Martin's church were transferred from the parish to the cemetery.

=== Pelota Court or Fronton ===
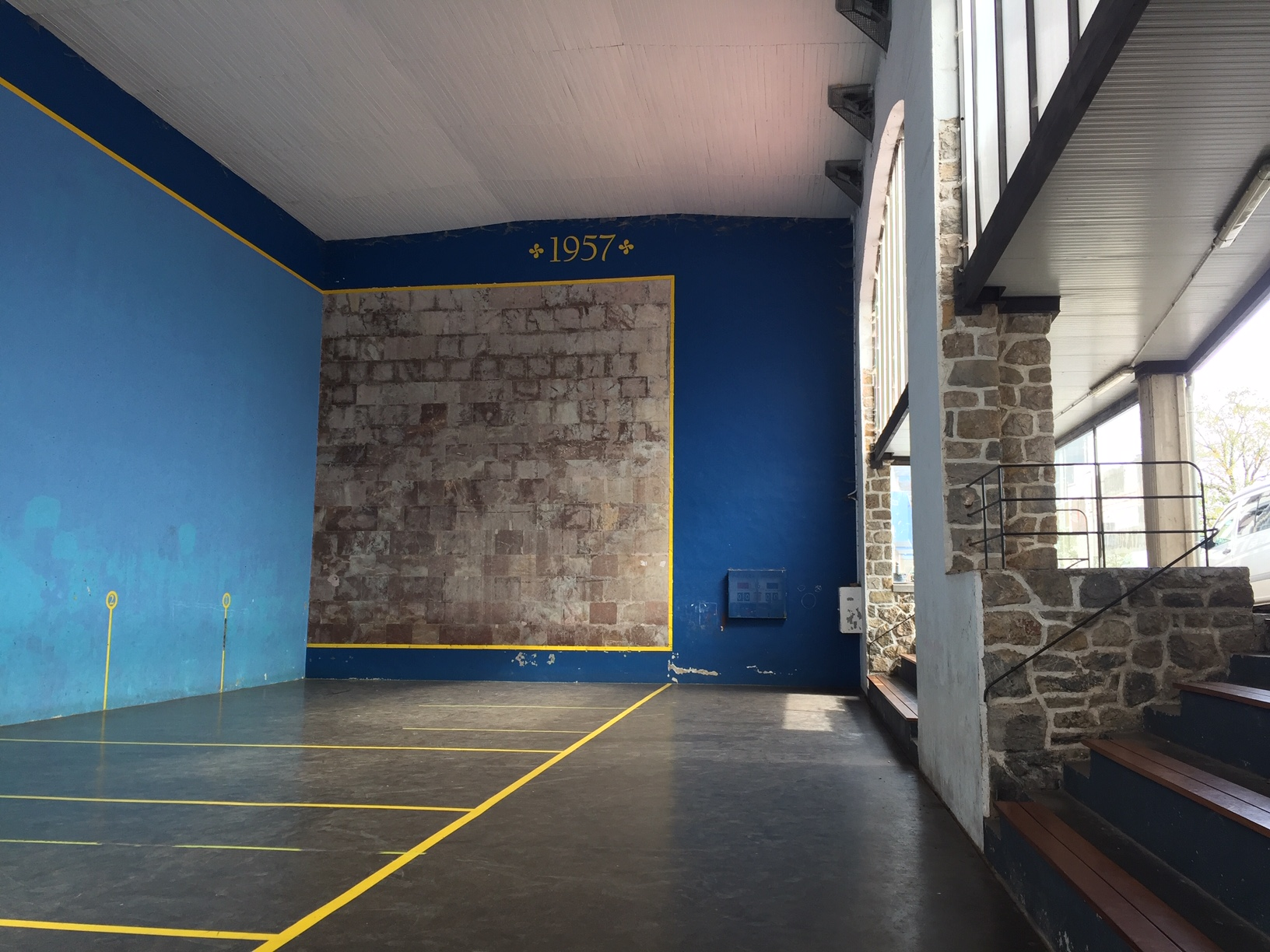
Pelota court

The pelota game has been practiced since ancient times in Alkiza, as indicated by the minor toponymy: for example in the names of lots such as Pelotaleku (place where pelota is played) or Mendiola-pelotalekuazpia (under the place where pelota is played in Mendiola). The first documented reference appears in the ordinances of 1735, where the practice of pelota was prohibited in the portico of the church during the hours of worship.

However, the first pelota court with a left wall was not built until 1922, financed by Echezarreta, Larrion and Aristi a paper mill from Irura, within the operation for the construction of the Elektralkiza hydroelectric power station. The left wall was built against the church of San Martín and the front-facing Katalandegi farmhouse. It was an important work, since there was any fronton with a left wall in all the nearby villages. The Telesforo Arregi, a local professional pelota player, commented the following in an interview carried out in 2003:

‘In the surrounding villages there were no fronton with a left wall and the one that had a liking ... all to Alkiza. From Hernialde, from Asteasu ,. In Asteasu there was only a small portico ... '

The current covered fronton was inaugurated on December 15, 1957. It was built by the Gipuzkoa Provincial Council in the context of the Day of the Municipalities of Gipuzkoa. In the opening match Atano X and Atano IX beat Atano III and Atano IV, 20–17.

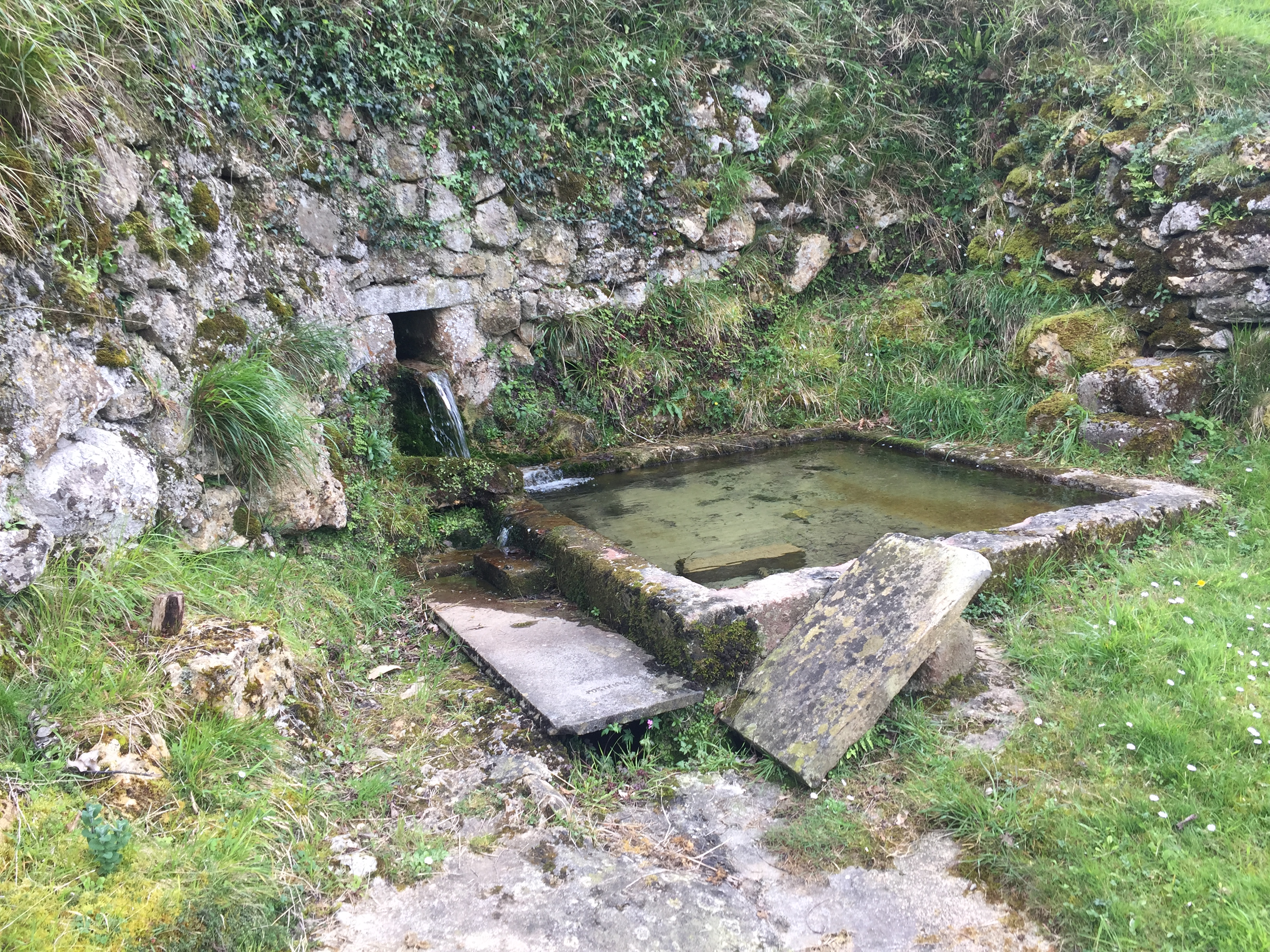
Fountain-sink of Etxabeguren Berri farmhouse

Being one of the few covered frontons in Gipuzkoa, there was a large influx of foreign people who came to play, until in the 1980s covered frontons began to be built in all the towns of the province.

=== Other places of interest ===
- They are some of the elements of Alkiza's ethnographic heritage such as Intxarraundiaga's limekiln, the Altzorbe's and Etxabeguren Berri's fountain-sink, Goiko Errota mill's water collection channels, the paved roads of Ilumbe, Askantxo and Lakapide, Elektralkiza’s dam and the wall of the garden of the Mariategi farmhouse.
- Fagus-Alkiza Interpretation Centre. It is the door to the Hernio-Gazume Special Conservation Area (Natura 2000 network).

== Known people from Alkiza ==
- Martin Díez Liatzasolokoa (1500–1583), sculptor.
- Anbrosio Bengoetxea (1551–1625), sculptor.
- Miguel de Irazusta (1665–1743), architect.
- Joan Bautista Intxaurrandiaga (1680?–1747), mason.
- Juan Irazusta (1688–1772), writer.
- Joan Elias Intxaurrandiaga (1735–1800?), sculptor.
- Antonio Sorrarrain (1928–2011), writer.
- Pello Joxe Aranburu Ugartemendia (1936-), teacher and writer
- Luis Mari Arantzabe (1949-), pelota player.
- Juan Luis Goenaga (1950-), painter
- Arantza Diaz de Illarraza, University professor and member of Ixa Research group.
- Xabier Artola (1957-), University professor and member of Ixa Research group.
- Inaki Irazabalbeitia (1957-), writer, MEP and member of the Academy of the Basque Language
- Koldobika Jauregi (1959-), sculptor.
- Barbara Goenaga (1983-), actress.
