= Hernio =

Mountain in the Basque Country

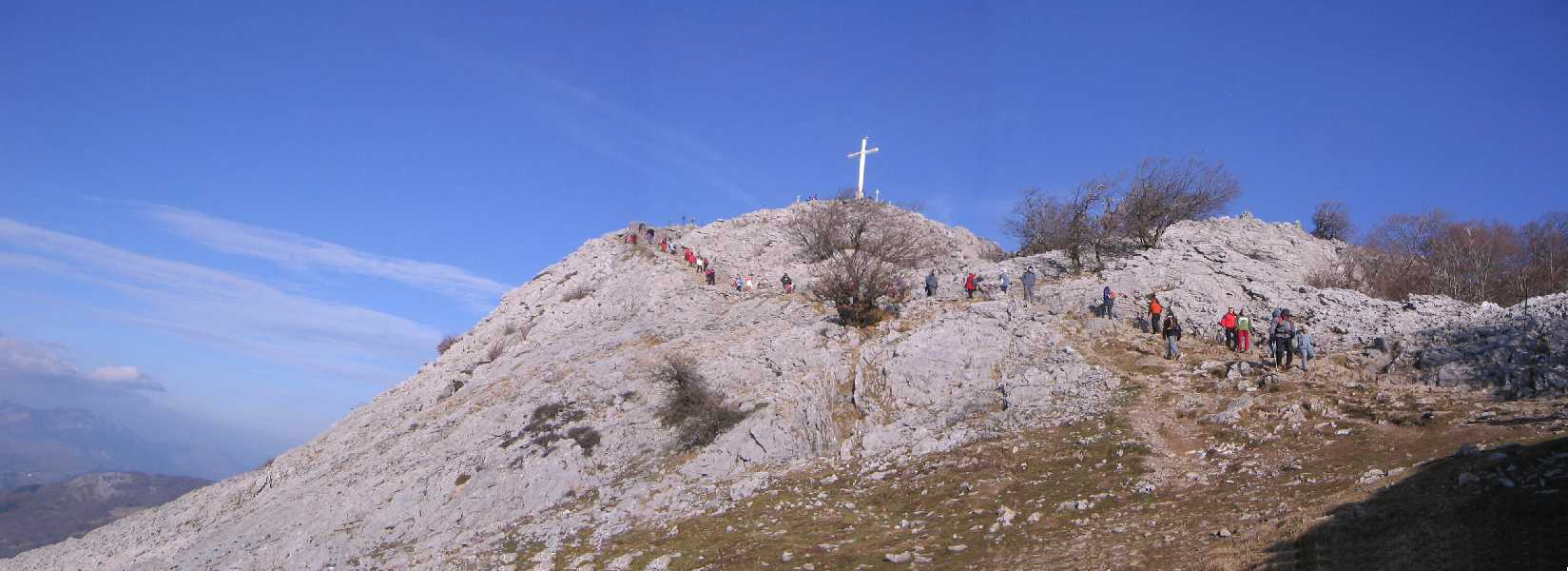
- Final stretch to the top of Hernio

Highest point
- Elevation: 1,200 m (3,900 ft)
- Coordinates: 43°10′16.99″N 02°09′5.69″W

Naming
- Language of name: Basque
- Pronunciation: Basque: [ˈernjo]

Geography
- Location within Spain
- Location: Gipuzkoa, Spain
- Parent range: Basque Mountains

Climbing
- Easiest route: From Iturriotz

Hernio (Basque pronunciation: [erˈniˌo]; also spelled Ernio) is an iconic summit in the Basque Country very popular with the Gipuzkoans and located right at the heart of the province. The peak is the highest point of a massif extending north-west to south-east, the summit rising by the pass of Zelatun. Neighbouring summits lined up NW to SE at the range are mount Gazume (997 m) standing west across the summit and mount Herniozabal (1,200 m) closing the range east at the rear. The villages lying at the feet of the mount are Errezil (SW), Alkiza (NE) and Asteasu (N). The summit of Hernio affords to the NW a beautiful view over Azpeitia and the stone bulk of Izarraitz towering over the town.

== Access points ==
As a popular destination for hikers and locals, Hernio may be reached through various trails setting out from different points.

=== Iturriotz ===
Iturriotz (580 m, the spot is reached through a road up setting out at Andatzarrate -road GI-2631-) is a former country inn, where according to historic accounts Ignatius of Loyola stayed overnight on his journey home from Paris in April 1535. A trail goes up and gains height along the stream Zelatun until the pass of the same name is reached (841 m). At the pass, a cluster of huts are found, and a beaten trail up must be taken on the left that cuts across the side of Hernio. The trail heading south-east, after a long slope is overcome, a couple of zigzags on pebbled soil lead to the top of the mountain. The way up takes 1h30 and back.

=== Alkiza ===
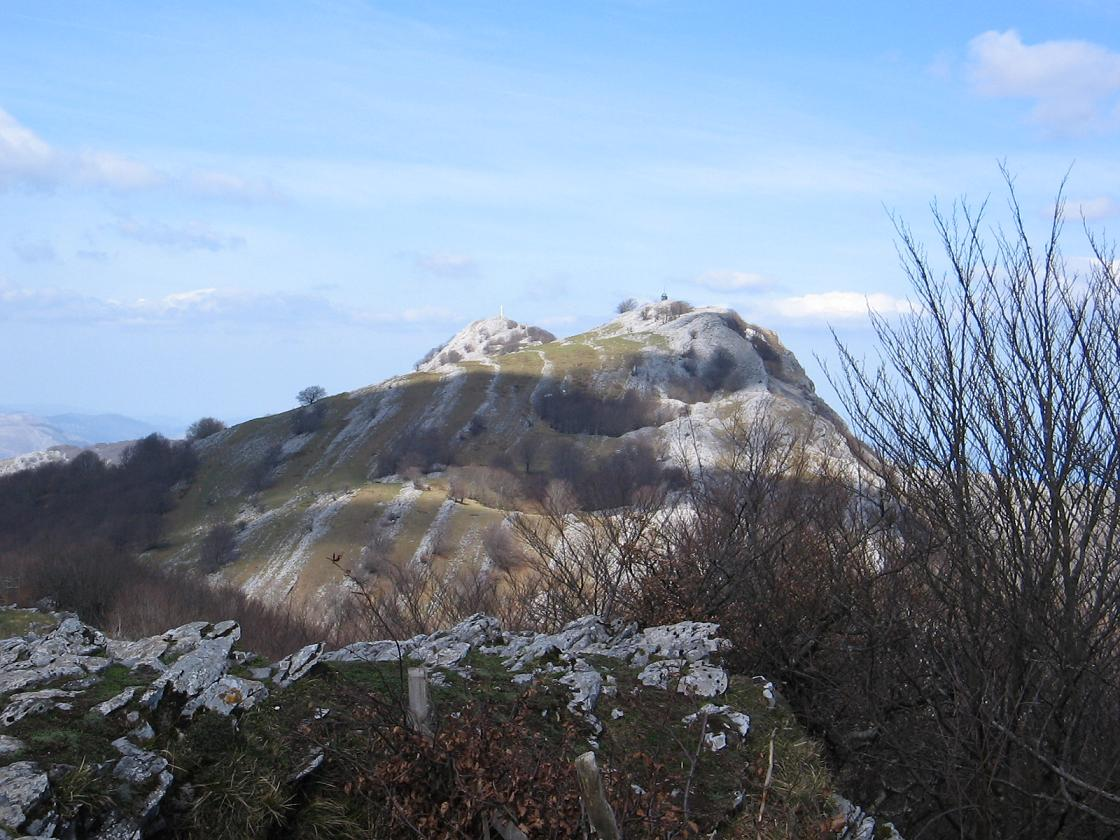
Hernio far in the distance and the ridge extending north-west

Starting from the road entering Alkiza (344 m high) from the south-west (GI-3630), a concrete track splits off on the left and leaves the houses behind. After a zigzag, a hiking trail heads up south-west along a fence and penetrates in a forest. The route (PR GI-78), shrouded in vegetation, is marked all along on rocks, signposts and trees, with a general direction west running along the mountain range (left). At the final stage before the pass of Zelatun, the path cuts across a clear landscape on a sloping terrain. From Zelatun, the final stretch as explained above. It takes some 2h30 to the peak and back.

=== Errezil ===
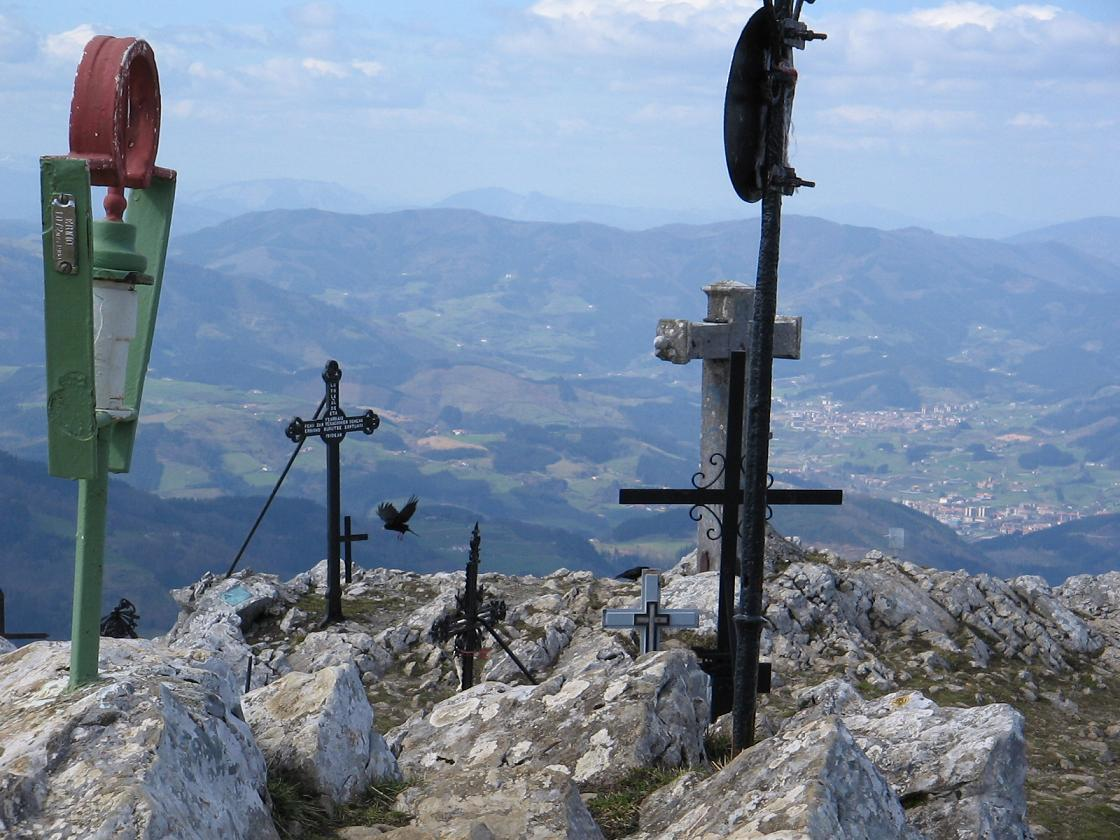
Crosses at the top of Hernio, with Azpeitia and Azkoitia down on the right

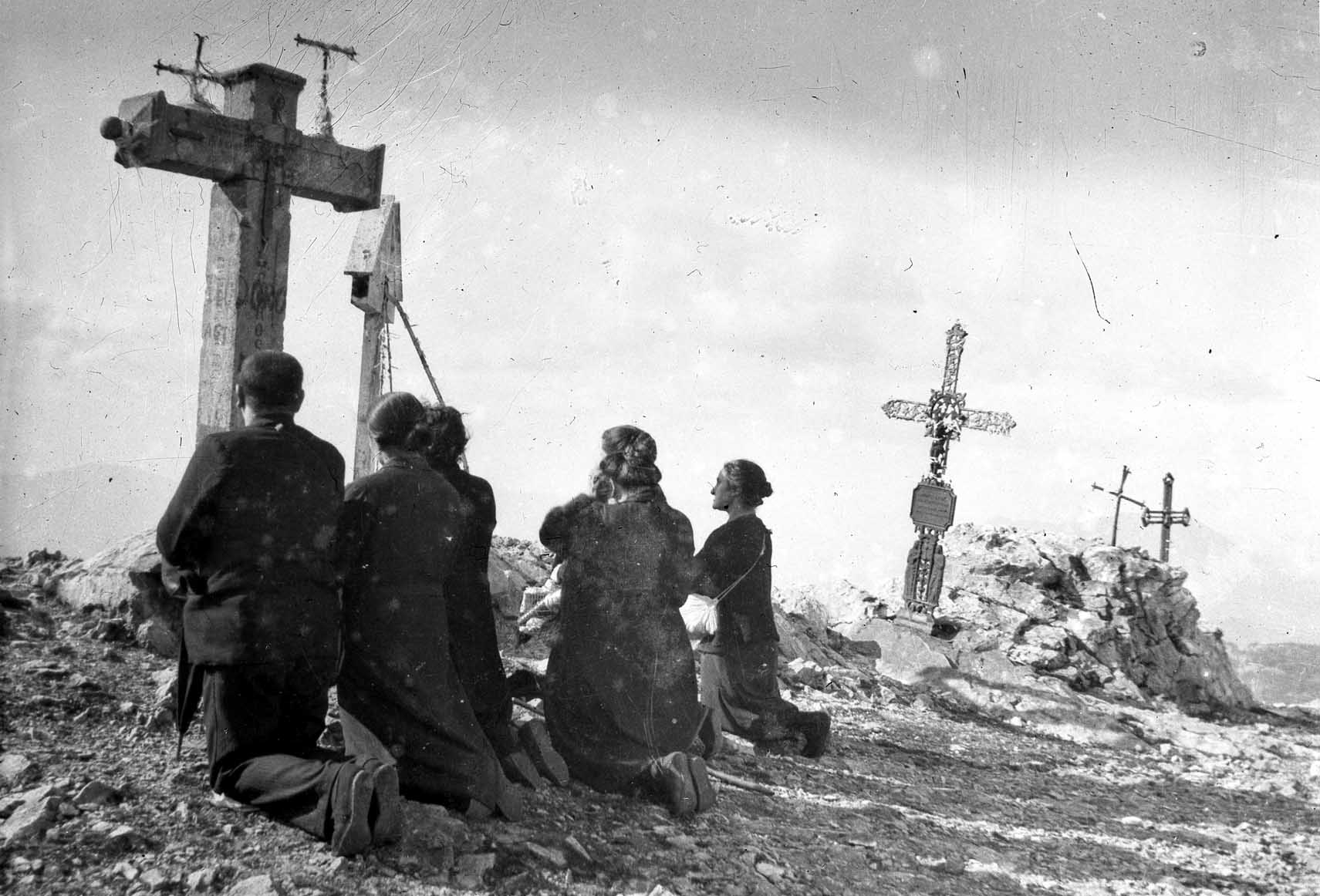
Devotees praying to crosses on the summit (early-mid 20th century)

The village lies right at the foot of the mount and therefore stands close to it. Yet this may be the hardest approach on account of its steep ascent. A dust track winds up from the road (GI-2634) to the very pass of Zelatun, so pick-ups and other SUV vehicles may be found at this spot, sometimes belonging to hunters. The ascent takes roughly 1h45 and back.

== Landscape and human presence ==
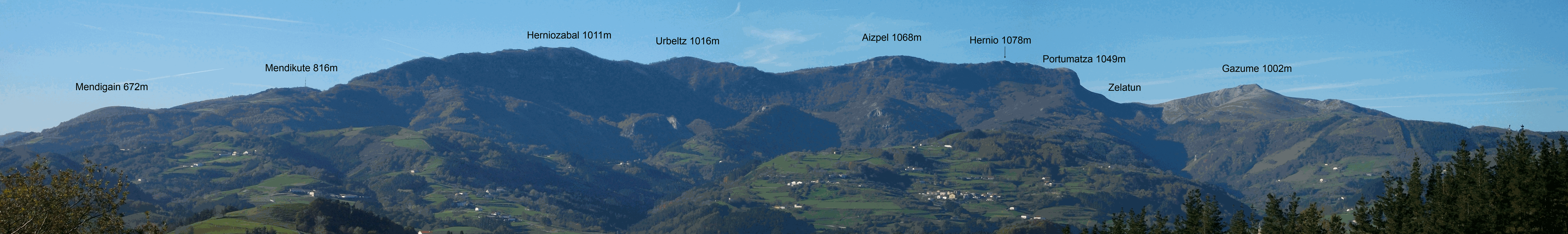
Panoramic view of Hernio from Txurro

Forest abounds in the massif, with various kinds of trees. In the course of the last century Monterrey pine and larch tree have gained ground at the expense of other autochthonous species. On the north face of the mountain range, beech forests cover the steep terrain. In addition, oak and chestnut tree patches may be found, with some birch trees few and far between. There are some grasslands especially at the north-west, at Zelatun and around. Actually, for centuries the pass has borne witness to seasonal migration of cattle from Aralar and even Urbasa to coastal pastures.

The massif has been inhabited for millennia, as attested in the grotto of Altxerri, where in 1962 wall paintings and rock carvings depicting bison, horses, reindeer, fish and other animals were unearthed.

== Tradition and events ==
- Not long ago, local scholars and folk accounts held rather romantically that heroic battles took place at Zelatun in Roman times between their army and the Cantabri. On the other hand, this assumption has been disputed by modern history, pinpointing such battle farther west, somewhere in Cantabria. It is no surprise that legend traces the name of the village at the foot, Errezil, to the phrase "errez hil", '(Romans) died easy', a folk etymology.
- The San Joan hermitage lies beside the building of Iturriotz (see above), where a festivity in honour of the saint is held on 24 June. In local lore, the water springing out of its walls cures scabies and ringworm.
- Hernio is renowned for its popular pilgrimages of September, held every Sunday of the month. The last Sunday is the most attended one, with a steady trail of people of all ages following the path to the top. The summit is covered with small crosses shrouded in beliefs, small memorials and a mountaineer postbox. Before the last attempt to the peak, metallic rings hanging from a cross may be grabbed and slid around whatever part of the body suffers a disease so as to heal it. At the fields of Zelatun a celebration steeped in music, dance and cheerful atmosphere takes place all day long.
- Since the early 2000s, hundreds turn out for the collective hike looping around the whole mountain range of Hernio. The event, called Erniopeko Martxa, is held in spring, with the walk starting early in the morning (in Alkiza in 2008). The route, stretching for 48,6 km, crosses eight villages surrounding the massif. Alternatively, another route provides a shorter approach through a short-cut that splits up the route in two.
