= Regil =

Regil may refer to:

- Marco Antonio Regil (born 1969), Mexican actor, television personality and game show host
- Regil, a small village in Winford, a civil parish in the Chew Valley, Somerset, England
- Errezil (Spanish: Régil), a town in Gipuzkoa, Basque Country, Spain

== See also ==
- Bárbara de Regil, Mexican actress
