= José Antonio Lopetegui =

Spanish weightlifter (1930–2024)

José Antonio Lopetegui Aranguren (1930 – 17 December 2024) was a Spanish weightlifter who competed in the traditional Basque sport of stone-lifting (harri-jasotze).

== Biography ==
Born in Azpeitia, Gipuzkoa in 1930, Lopetegui was one of eleven siblings; all eight brothers took part in the same sport. He was known by the nickname Aguerre II, with his older brother Luis being Aguerre I. He was able to lift a 100 kg stone 22 times in a minute. The eight brothers attempted to set a record of each lifting 188 kg at the same time, but were persuaded not to by their wives, who considered stone-lifting to be a rural pastime not befitting of their new statuses as urban businessmen. Aguerre I died in 1969, leaving the attempt unfulfilled and Aguerre II the pre-eminent face in the sport.

On the orders of General Francisco Franco, Lopetegui was courted to be a heavyweight boxer, an offer that would have made him wealthier and more famous nationally and internationally. He turned down the offer as he considered himself to be sufficiently wealthy through his businesses: a bus company, restaurant and hostel. A fellow Basque, José Manuel Urtain, took up the dictator's invitation and achieved fame before committing suicide.

Lopetegui was also the mayor of Asteasu. Among his children was Julen Lopetegui, who played for and managed the Spain national football team.

Lopetegui died on 17 December 2024, at the age of 94.
