= Tolosa, Spain =

Municipality in Basque Country, Spain

Tolosa
- Municipality
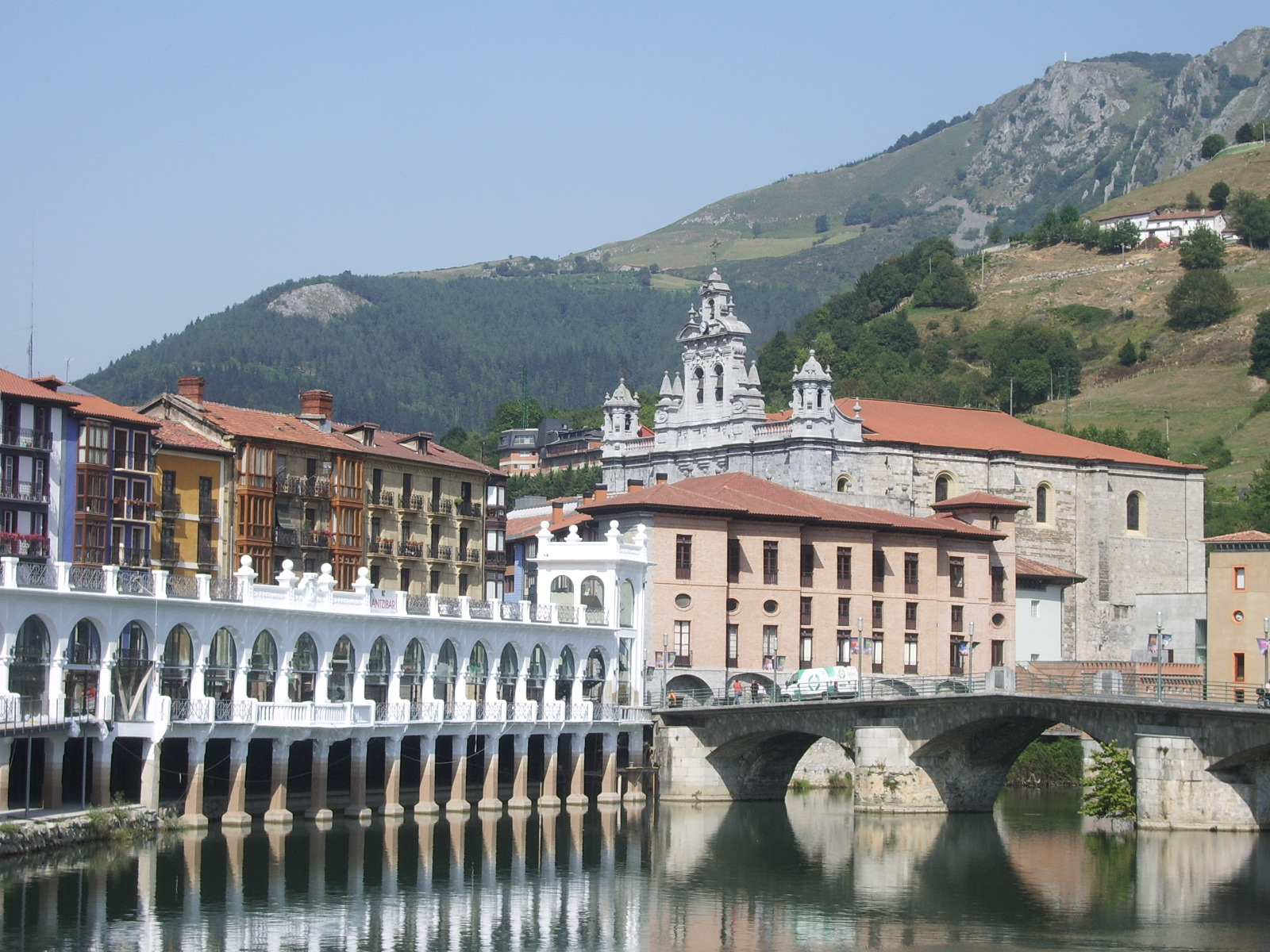
- General view of Tolosa

- Coat of arms

- Location of Tolosa within the Basque Autonomous Community Tolosa (Spain)
- Coordinates: 43°8′N 2°5′W
- Country: Spain
- Autonomous community: País Vasco
- Province: Gipuzkoa
- Eskualdea: Tolosaldea
- Founded: 1256

Government
  - Mayor: Olatz Peón (PNV)

Area
  - Total: 37.39 km^{2} (14.44 sq mi)
- Elevation: 75 m (246 ft)

Population (2025-01-01)
  - Total: 20,070
  - Density: 536.8/km^{2} (1,390/sq mi)
- Demonym(s): Tolosano/a, Tolosarra
- Time zone: UTC+1 (CET)
  - Summer (DST): UTC+2 (CEST)
- Postal code: 20400
- Official language(s): Spanish, Basque
- Website: Official website

Tolosa (Spanish and Basque: [toˈlosa]) is a town and municipality in the Basque province of Gipuzkoa, in northern Spain. It is located in the valley of the river Oria, next by Uzturre, a local mountain topped by a white cross.

Its economy relies primarily on the industrial sector, specifically papermaking.

== Geography ==
=== Neighbourhoods ===
Iurre, Berazubi, Bidebieta, San Esteban, Izaskun, San Blas, Amarotz, Usabal, Santa Lutzia, Montezkue, Belate, Belabieta, Alde Zaharra (Parte Vieja), Auzo Txikia, Alliri, Arramele, Iparragirre, Urkizu, Aldaba, Larramendi, Aldaba Txiki, Banjul, and Bedaio.

== Notable buildings ==
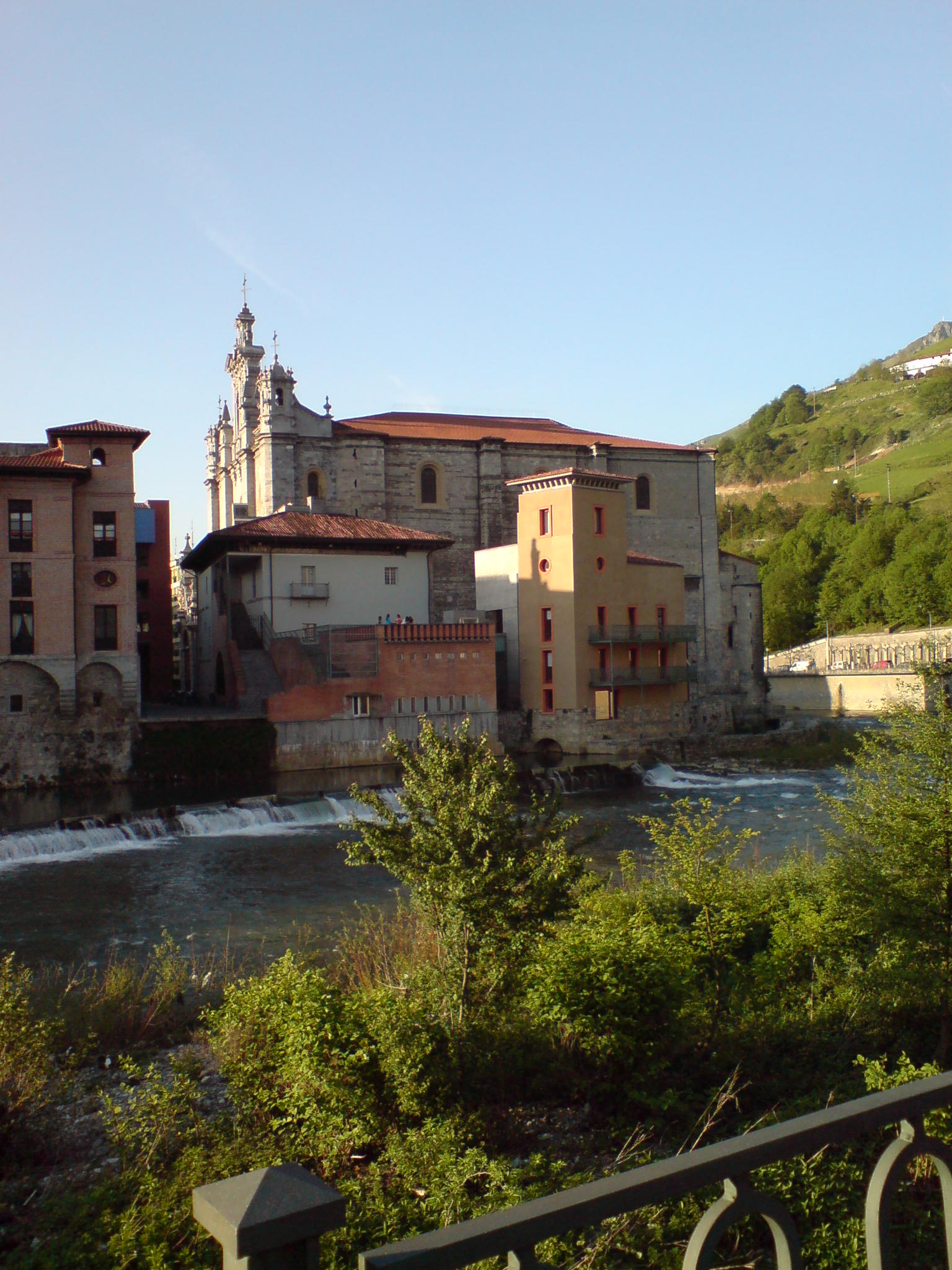
Saint Mary church

- Provincial archive of Gipuzkoa, built in 1904 by the architect Cortázar, was one of the first to be built in concrete in the province. From the sixteenth century, Tolosa was home to the provincial archives, formerly located in the parish.
- Town Hall, built between 1657 and 1672, Baroque style, with a ground floor portico and wrought iron balconies. Work of the master stonecutter Juan de Arburola.
- Zerkausi Market
- Old Town Hall, a rectangular elongated building that follows the line of the old wall so its façade is perpendicular to the streets of the old town, blocking its southern view. In Neoclassical style, it was completely remodeled in the 1980s as a cultural center. Between 1844 and 1854 it was the seat of the Provincial Council of Gipuzkoa.
- Convent of Saint Francis, located at the exit of the Camino Real a Castilla. With a basilica floor plan, it was constructed circa 1676 by Nicolás de Zumeta and Agustín de Lizarraga. The retablo of its main altar and the chapel of the Antia are notable.
- Convent of Saint Clara. Baroque monastery (18th century) of the Poor Clares with a Churrigueresque-Rococo gilded main altarpiece.
- Church of Saint Mary, with 1,630 m^{2} (17,500 sq ft) of surface at present. The original church was affected by a fire in 1503, but until 1548 works could not be started for lack of money. A building was then erected with three high naves topped by false ribbed vaults supported by six columns, in the local variant of Gothic style called Basque Gothic. In 1761 Martín de Carrera endowed it with the current Baroque façade with a central bell-gable and two towers joined by a balustrade, and a few years later the atrium was added. In the nineteenth century Silvestre Pérez made some Neoclassical alterations. It has a central altarpiece, and in one of the side chapels is preserved the Romanesque-Gothic doorway of the hermitage of San Esteban, which was destroyed by a flood.
- Church of Corpus Christi.
- Palace of Aranburu (17th century), prototype of the Basque Baroque. It is a free-standing building with an irregular floor planned with hipped roof. An austere façade of cushioned ashlars follows the principles of symmetry and centrality characteristic of classicism. A decoration on the main door links with that of the central balcony. The coat of arms of the jurisconsult Miguel de Aramburu, author in 1697 of the Compilation of the Fueros of Gipuzkoa, is present.
- Palace of Atodo (16th century), at 35 Calle Mayor in the Renaissance style with ample proportions and façade of ashlars protected by double aileron of carved canes. It features wrought-iron balconies on the main floor and twenty symmetrical openings with lowered arches on the top floor. An artistic coat of arms with rampant lion is shown by a pair of infants in graceful foreshortening. It is the birthplace of Fermín de Atodo, palatine count, captain of the Tercios tolosanos in 1558 and ambassador of Philip II in Rome.
- Palace of Justice (1853), occupies one side of the public square's portico. It is a neoclassical group with unified composition, emphasizing the palace through a greater wealth of materials and two floors instead of three with adjoining houses. The portico is transformed here into an arcade. There is a façade of limestone ashlars on the ground floor and recesses and imposts. It is the work of local architects Unanue and Escoriaza. In the court's prison, the bard José María Iparraguirre composed the zortziko Nere amak baleki ('If my mother knew'). In 2009 it was the headquarters of the Tolosa International Puppet Center TOPIC.
- Palace of Idiakez, built in 1605, rises above the wall in the area of the old Puerta de Navarra. The current building is estimated to date from the eighteenth century after a fire destroyed the previous tower. Its main façade is of hammered ashlar, enclosing the Old Square, while the rear one is of sawtooth brick over the river. In 1794 it was occupied by the fabulist Félix María de Samaniego when he was mayor of Tolosa. The building is today the headquarters of the Casino of Tolosa.
- Door of Castille
- Tolosa Bullring opened on 24 June 1903 (Ricardo Torres Reina ("Bombita") was scheduled to do so, but due to injury he was replaced by Francisco Bonar Casado ("Bonarillo") and Guerrerito). It has a ring of 37.5 m (123 ft) with a 1.8 m (5 ft 11 in) corridor and 5300 seats. The stands and boxes are above the ring, which gives it a special proportionality. Basque rural sport competitions (korrikalaris, aizkolaris, stone lifting, etc.) are held here. The city carnivals hold a running of the heifers every afternoon from the day of Fat Thursday and the bull of the brandy on the morning of Tuesday of Carnival.
- Andia Tower located at number 17 on Calle Mayor. Only vestiges of the shield and two gargoyles remain, in addition to the foundations of this medieval building where the enlightened Domenjón González de Andia lived, considered "King of Gipuzkoa" (Gipuzkoako Erregia).

== Nature ==
One of Europe's tallest Douglas fir trees can be found in the fir plantation in Tolosa.

== History ==
A 9000-year-old human settlement was discovered in the neighbourhood of San Esteban. From the tools and remains of flint carvings found, it would be a group whose economy was based on hunting and fruit gathering.

From the Bronze Age, about 4000 years old, are the dolmens of Belabieta and Añi, burial constructions that bear witness to the first religious manifestations.

In the Iron Age, about 2300 years ago, the first settlements appear. They settled on medium-high mountains, such as Intxur in Aldaba, and protected themselves by surrounding themselves with walls. In addition to their knowledge of iron, they were farmers and ranchers.

The whole of antiquity, including Romanization and until at least 1025, when Gipuzkoa entered history, is an obscure period about which little is known.

The territory of Gipuzkoa was incorporated to Castile in 1200. In 1256, King Alfonso X the Wise of Castile granted the charter to Tolosa, naming it after Toulouse, France. In this charter, the inhabitants of Tolosa were granted privileges that were not granted to the inhabitants of nearby villages, nor to those of other provinces. It also provided for the fortification of Tolosa, Ordizia and Segura, border points with Navarre. The original city was built on an island separated by an arm of the Oria that passed through the current Calle de la Rondilla (previously named after Pablo Gorosábel) and is completely walled, with six gates equipped with defense towers (gates of Castile, Arramele, Navarre, Casa de las Damas, Matadero and Our Lady of Help).

In 1282 it suffered a fire that destroyed it. Sancho IV of Castile granted new privileges to encourage its reconstruction and the arrival of new inhabitants, including freeing those who were to settle there of all tribute to the Crown (Vitoria-Gasteiz, 20 April 1290), privileges later confirmed by Ferdinand IV of Castile and Alfonso XI of Castile.

However, maintaining these privileges was problematic at times, as when in 1463 the tax collector Jacob Gaón demanded payment of the tax called pedido from the Tolosans. They replied that they were exempt from payment because of the provisions approved by the king. Gaón threatened them, and several of them killed him, beheaded him, and put his head on a pillory as punishment for having put Tolosa at the top of his list of collections. King Henry IV of Castile went to Tolosa to avenge his death, but the perpetrators fled the village. The king ordered the house where the crime was committed to be demolished. He did not execute the perpetrators, since before catching them he received a petition from the Junta of Gipuzkoa requesting pardon for the Tolosans, and presented their arguments, and Henry IV acknowledged that they were exempt from payment.

The prevailing insecurity since the 14th century means that over two centuries, several towns and villages joined and separated from the council of Tolosa, including Abaltzisketa, Aduna, Albiztur, Alegia, Alkiza, Altzo, Amasa, Amezketa, Andoain, Anoeta, Asteasu, Baliarrain, Belauntza, Berastegi, Berrobi, Zizurkil, Elduain, Ezama, Gaztelu, Hernialde, Ibarra, Ikaztegieta, Irura, Laskoain, Leaburu, Lizartza, Orendain, Orexa and Igorre. Tolosa is committed to the defense of the towns, which remain under the jurisdiction of the mayor, and are usually ascribed the privileges and charters of Tolosa. During the fourteenth century there were various disagreements with these cities and a conflict with San Sebastián over the cases of Andoain, Aduna and Alkiza, which was settled in 1479 with the transfer of these three towns to the jurisdiction of San Sebastian.

In 1469 it underwent another important fire, and another major one in 1503 that affected even the parish church, despite being isolated. In both cases it was granted new privileges to aid in its reconstruction, and the Catholic Monarchs issued an order for the mayor of the province to reside in Tolosa when not visiting other towns.

After the uprising of the Count of Salvatierra in 1520, during the Revolt of the Comuneros, Tolosa was on the communal side, and the royalist army defeated the resistance of Tolosa and other Basque communal towns after the defeat of the army of the Count of Salvatierra, Pedro López de Ayala, in the battle of Miñano Mayor on 19 April 1521.

On 9 August 1794, during the War of the Pyrenees, French troops occupied Tolosa. During the Peninsular War it was occupied again. While it was dominated by the Napoleonic army it suffered attacks from area guerrillas.

From 1844 to 1854 under the government of the Progressives, Tolosa was the capital of Gipuzkoa for two years, later returning to San Sebastián, which had been declared the capital city in the decrees of 1822 and 1833, with the consequent transfer of the regional council and all management to the new capital of the province.

Tolosa was one of the most important cities of the territory controlled by the Carlists in the civil war of 1872–1876, and was one of the headquarters of the newspaper El Cuartel Real.

=== Spanish Civil War ===
On 11 August 1936 Tolosa was captured by rebel Nationalist troops under Major Latorre.

=== Later ===
On 29 March 1939, there was a fatal accident on the overnight Sud Express train between Paris and Lisbon.

== Notable people ==
- José Antonio Zorreguieta, direct ancestor (born 13 February 1777) of Queen Máxima of the Netherlands
- Xabi Alonso, footballer
- Mikel Alonso, footballer
- Periko Alonso, footballer
- Ainhoa Arteta, soprano
- Javier Bello-Portu, composer
- Edurne Pasaban, mountaineer
- Juan de Tolosa, founder of Zacatecas, Mexico
- Juan Manuel Lillo, football coach
- Lara Arruabarrena, tennis player
- Isidro Larrañaga, accordionist
