= Julen Lopetegui =

Spanish footballer and manager (born 1966)

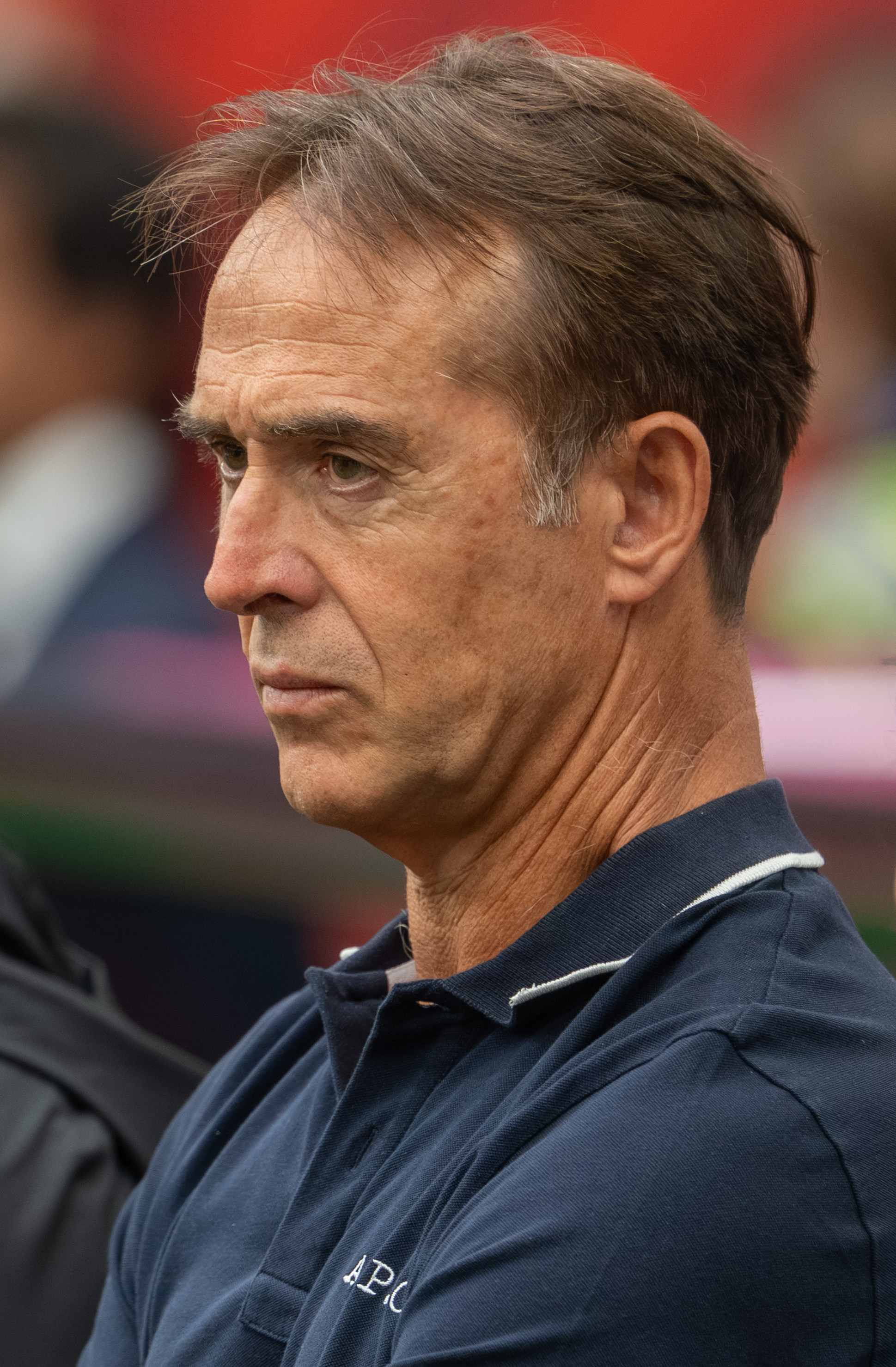
- Lopetegui in 2026

Personal information
- Full name: Julen Lopetegui Argote
- Date of birth: 28 August 1966 (age 60)
- Place of birth: Asteasu, Spain
- Height: 1.85 m (6 ft 1 in)
- Position: Goalkeeper

Team information
- Current team: Qatar (manager)

Youth career
- Real Sociedad

Senior career*
Years	Team	Apps	(Gls)
1985–1988	Castilla	61	(0)
1988–1991	Real Madrid	1	(0)
1988–1989	→ Las Palmas (loan)	31	(0)
1991–1994	Logroñés	107	(0)
1994–1997	Barcelona	5	(0)
1997–2002	Rayo Vallecano	112	(0)
Total		317	(0)

International career
1985	Spain U21	1	(0)
1994	Spain	1	(0)
1993–2000	Basque Country	3	(0)

Managerial career
- 2003: Rayo Vallecano
- 2008–2009: Real Madrid B
- 2010–2013: Spain U19
- 2010–2014: Spain U20
- 2012–2014: Spain U21
- 2014–2016: Porto
- 2016–2018: Spain
- 2018: Real Madrid
- 2019–2022: Sevilla
- 2022–2023: Wolverhampton Wanderers
- 2024–2025: West Ham United
- 2025–: Qatar
Medal record
Men's football
Representing Spain (as player)
FIFA U-20 World Cup
Runner-up	1985
Representing Spain (as manager)
UEFA European Under-19 Championship
Winner	2012
UEFA European Under-21 Championship
Winner	2013
- * Club domestic league appearances and goals

Julen Lopetegui Argote (Spanish pronunciation: [ˈʝulen lopeˈteɣjaˈɣote]; born 28 August 1966) is a Spanish professional football manager and former footballer. He is the current manager of the Qatar national team.

A goalkeeper, he played 149 La Liga matches over nine seasons, representing Real Madrid, Logroñés, Barcelona and Rayo Vallecano in the competition. He added 168 appearances in the Segunda División for three clubs, winning one cap for Spain and being a member of the squad at the 1994 World Cup.

Lopetegui started working as a manager in 2003, and spent several years in charge of Spain's youth teams, leading the under-19 and under-21 sides to European titles. He was also head coach of the senior national team for two years, but was dismissed before the start of the 2018 World Cup following the announcement of his agreement to join Real Madrid after the tournament. In club football, he managed Rayo Vallecano, Castilla, Porto, Real Madrid, Sevilla, Wolverhampton Wanderers and West Ham United, winning the 2020 Europa League with Sevilla.

== Club career ==
Born in Asteasu, Gipuzkoa, Lopetegui started his professional career at local Real Sociedad. In 1985, he accepted an offer from Real Madrid, where the 19-year-old played in the B team.

After a loan spell at Las Palmas, Lopetegui returned, but could never dislodge another veteran, Francisco Buyo, only managing one La Liga appearance over two seasons, a 3–3 away draw against Atlético Madrid as Real were already crowned league champions. He subsequently signed with Logroñés, being instrumental as the modest Riojan club consistently managed to retain its top-flight status.

When Andoni Zubizarreta left for Valencia in 1994, Lopetegui joined Barcelona, battling – and losing – for first-choice status with longtime understudy Carles Busquets. After the Catalans bought Porto's Vítor Baía, he was further demoted to third string, and returned to Madrid with Segunda División club Rayo Vallecano in 1997.

Lopetegui was a starter in his first two seasons at Rayo, culminating with their play-off final win over Extremadura in June 1999. After returning to the top tier he lost his place to American international Kasey Keller and then Imanol Etxeberria; he played 36 top-flight games from 1999 to 2002. He was nonetheless favoured for the team's run to the quarter-finals of the UEFA Cup in 2000–01, where they were eliminated by compatriots Alavés. He retired at the age of 36.

== International career ==
Lopetegui's performances at Logroñés earned him his sole cap with Spain, coming on as a substitute for Zubizarreta for the final 30 minutes of a 2–0 friendly loss to Croatia in Valencia, on 23 March 1994. He was subsequently picked for the squad at that year's FIFA World Cup.

== Coaching career ==
=== Beginnings ===
Lopetegui was one of Spain coach Juan Santisteban's assistants at the 2003 UEFA European Under-17 Championship. After the tournament, he had his first head coaching spell at Rayo, with the club in the second division, but was sacked after the tenth match of the 2003–04 campaign, which ended in relegation to Segunda División B. After working as a sports commentator, including for LaSexta in the 2006 FIFA World Cup, he returned to coaching, with Real Madrid Castilla, who he played for in the 1980s, now in the third tier.

From 2010 to 2014, Lopetegui worked with the Spanish youth teams, winning the 2012 European Under-19 Championship and the 2013 Under-21 Championship. He left the Royal Spanish Football Federation on 30 April 2014, following the expiration of his contract.

=== Porto ===
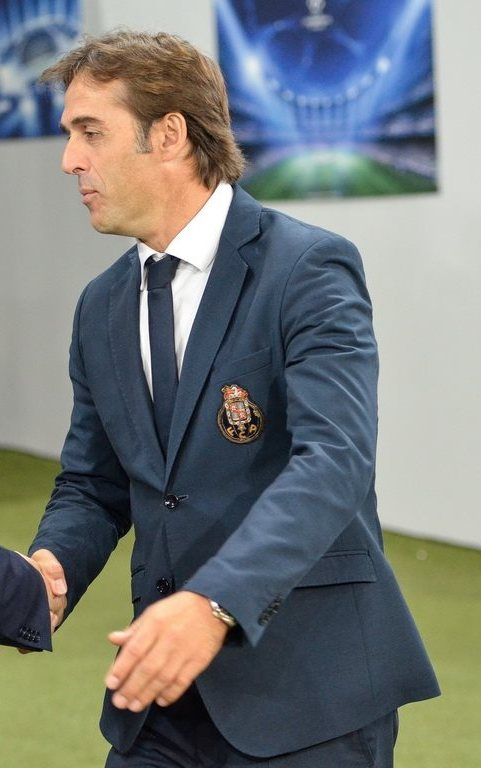
Lopetegui during a match with Porto in September 2014

Lopetegui returned to club duties on 6 May 2014, being appointed at Portugal's Porto. He signed seven Spanish players to the club that summer.

In his first season at the Estádio do Dragão, with the club's biggest budget ever, Lopetegui led them to the quarter-finals of the UEFA Champions League, where they equalled the club's biggest defeat in European competitions losing 6–1 against Bayern Munich (having lost by the same score to AEK Athens in 1978). He failed to win any silverware, contributing to the longest drought during Jorge Nuno Pinto da Costa's presidency.

On 8 January 2016, after a 1–3 home loss to Marítimo in the Taça da Liga, as Porto had already been eliminated from the Champions League and was ranked third in the domestic league after an away loss and a home draw, Lopetegui was relieved of his duties and replaced by Rui Barros. A week later, the club announced that it had terminated the former's contract unilaterally.

=== Spain ===
On 21 July 2016, after being strongly linked to English side Wolverhampton Wanderers which was under new ownership, Lopetegui was announced as the new manager of the Spain national team following Vicente del Bosque's retirement. In his first match in charge, on 1 September, he led them to a 2–0 friendly victory over Belgium at the King Baudouin Stadium; the nation qualified for the 2018 World Cup, winning nine and drawing one of their group matches.

On 12 June 2018, with the team already in Russia for the tournament, it was announced that Lopetegui would take over as the head coach of Real Madrid on a three-year contract after the conclusion of Spain's involvement at the World Cup. The following day, he was dismissed from his job with the national team and replaced by Fernando Hierro.

=== Real Madrid ===
Lopetegui's first competitive game in charge took place on 15 August 2018, in a 4–2 loss to rivals Atlético Madrid in the UEFA Super Cup after extra time. He thus became the second Real manager to start his tenure by conceding four goals, after Englishman Michael Keeping who began in 1948 being downed 4–1 by Celta.

Following a string of bad results and, ultimately, a 5–1 away defeat to Barcelona in El Clásico on 28 October 2018, Lopetegui was fired a day later, being replaced by Santiago Solari.

=== Sevilla ===
On 5 June 2019, Lopetegui was appointed as the new Sevilla manager on a three-year contract. In his first year, they finished fourth to qualify for the Champions League, and on 21 August they defeated Inter Milan 3–2 in the 2020 UEFA Europa League final, his first club honour.

Lopetegui agreed to a further two-year extension on 10 January 2021. On 5 October 2022, however, following five losses in eight matches in the new season – the last being 4–1 at home against Borussia Dortmund in the Champions League – he was dismissed.

=== Wolverhampton Wanderers ===
After leaving Sevilla, Lopetegui was interviewed by Wolverhampton, who had recently dismissed Bruno Lage, but he initially turned down the offer due to his 92-year-old father's ill health. He was approached again and, on 5 November 2022, announced he would become the club's new head coach effective 14 November. On his competitive debut on 20 December, his team defeated EFL League Two side Gillingham 2–0 at home in the fourth round of the EFL Cup; this put them into the last eight for the first time since 1995–96. Six days later, on his Premier League bow, they won 2–1 at Everton with a last-minute Rayan Aït-Nouri goal, and the manager thereby became the first at the club to win his opening match in the top flight since John Barnwell in 1978.

Lopetegui eventually led Wolves to 13th place. In May 2023, he addressed speculation that he would leave due to the West Midlands club's financial situation; he had stressed the need for new players to the management, but had only learned of the severity of the economic constraints at the end of the campaign. Due to this and other reported disagreements, he left by mutual consent on 8 August.

=== West Ham United ===
On 23 May 2024, Lopetegui remained in the English top division as the new head coach of West Ham United, taking the place of the recently departed David Moyes; he signed a two-year contract with an option for a third year. On his debut on 17 August, he oversaw a 2–1 home loss against Aston Villa, as the Hammers broke a league record by being defeated 16 times on opening days. He achieved his first win one week later, 2–0 at Crystal Palace.

In January 2025, West Ham were reported to be considering sacking Lopetegui following a 5–0 home defeat against Liverpool and a 4–1 loss to Manchester City. They had also been reported to have been considering his dismissal the previous month, before he achieved a 2–1 win over Wolverhampton Wanderers and went on a four-match unbeaten run, their best of the season. He was relieved of his duties on 8 January with the team in 14th position, seven points above the relegation positions; during his tenure, they lost nine of 20 Premier League games, and he broke Lou Macari's record of the fewest matches managed by a permanent manager of the club by taking charge of 18 less than Macari's 40.

=== Qatar ===
On 1 May 2025, Lopetegui was announced as the new manager of the Qatar national team until the 2027 AFC Asian Cup; he became the third Spaniard ever in less than two years to be appointed at the job. On 14 October, his side qualified for the 2026 FIFA World Cup after defeating the United Arab Emirates 2–1, marking a first-ever presence in the tournament through that stage and their second overall.

== Style of management ==
Sporting director Monchi, who worked with Lopetegui at Sevilla, described him as having three virtues that are fundamental for any coach: great professional qualities, competitiveness and group management. He also highlighted Lopetegui's fit to work in big clubs saying that 'Julen perfectly understands what a big club needs, he has his requests, but it’s normal, and he always works in sync with the club. He is demanding but only for the good of those who appointed him and never out of selfishness.'

== Personal life ==
Lopetegui's father, José Antonio, was a weightlifter. During Francisco Franco's dictatorial regime, he acted as mayor of Asteasu.

== Managerial statistics ==
As of match played 17 November 2026

Managerial record by team and tenure
Team	Nat.	From	To	Record								Ref.
Team	Nat.	From	To	G	W	D	L	GF	GA	GD	Win %	Ref.
Rayo Vallecano	(Spain)	1 July 2003	3 November 2003	11	2	2	7	10	17	−7	18.18	
Real Madrid B	(Spain)	1 July 2008	30 June 2009	38	18	9	11	60	45	+15	47.37	
Spain U19-U20-U21	(Spain)	1 August 2010	30 April 2014	45	38	3	4	131	48	+83	84.44	
Porto	(Portugal)	1 July 2014	7 January 2016	78	53	16	9	159	54	+105	67.95	
Spain	(Spain)	21 July 2016	13 June 2018	20	14	6	0	61	13	+48	70.00	
Real Madrid	(Spain)	1 July 2018	29 October 2018	14	6	2	6	21	20	+1	42.86	
Sevilla	(Spain)	5 June 2019	5 October 2022	170	90	44	36	247	163	+84	52.94	
Wolverhampton Wanderers	(England)	14 November 2022	8 August 2023	27	10	6	11	28	38	−10	37.04	
West Ham United	(England)	1 July 2024	8 January 2025	22	7	5	10	26	44	−18	31.82	
Qatar	(Qatar)	1 May 2025	Present	22	4	7	11	14	34	−20	18.18	
Career Total				447	241	101	105	753	473	+280	53.91	

== Honours ==
=== Player ===
Real Madrid

- La Liga: 1989–90

Barcelona

- Supercopa de España: 1994, 1996

Spain U20

- FIFA World Youth Championship runner-up: 1985

=== Manager ===
Sevilla

- UEFA Europa League: 2019–20

Spain U19

- UEFA European Under-19 Championship: 2012

Spain U21

- UEFA European Under-21 Championship: 2013
