= Isidro Larrañaga Accordion Orchestra =

Group of Spanish accordion players

The Isidro Larrañaga Accordion Orchestra is an accordion group based in Tolosa, Spain, and founded by Isidro Larrañaga Beloki in 1980. It has about 25 members aged between 14 and 35. The director is Isitxo Larrañaga Moreno.

== History ==
The Orchestra debuted by performing in the towns of Araba, Biscay, Gipuzkoa, and Navarre. Its first international tour was in France in 1985. In May 1985, the orchestra performed on the RTVE program Gente Joven. In November 1985, the orchestra gained international fame by winning first prize and the gold medal of the XVI Accordion International Grand Prix, held in Mutzig, France.

In 1988, the Orchestra offered various performances on the RTVE program Por La Mañana and on the ETB program Iñigo En Directo. It also participated in several festivals in Navarre and Gipuzkoa between 1987 and 1989, organized with the aid of town delegations and the Council of Culture of the Basque government.

A second orchestra formed by students between 9 and 15 years old was founded in 1987 under the direction of Isidro Larrañaga. In 1997, the youth and regular orchestras participated in the XVII Accordion International Gran Prix in Bischwiller, France, receiving silver medals.

In 1998, the Orchestra took part in the Castelfidardo International Great Prize of Accordions, receiving another silver medal. In 2000, it participated in the XVIII Accordion International Gran Prix held in Geneva, winning gold. In 2001, it participated in the X International Accordion Contest of Cantabria, winning another gold medal.

In 2002, the junior and senior orchestras took part in the XI International Accordion Contest of Cantabria, both winning golds. The next year, at the XII International, the youth section won gold, and the adult silver.

Between 3 and 12 December 2004, the orchestra offered several concerts in three Austrian cities (Innsbruck, Salzburg, and Vienna). In May 2007, they performed at several concerts in Galicia. In October 2007, the orchestra won the prestigious Prague Harmonica Days Prize against 7 other international orchestras, scoring 23.8 points out of 25 and winning by .8 points.
