= Uzturre =

Coordinates: 43°09′19″N 2°02′46″W

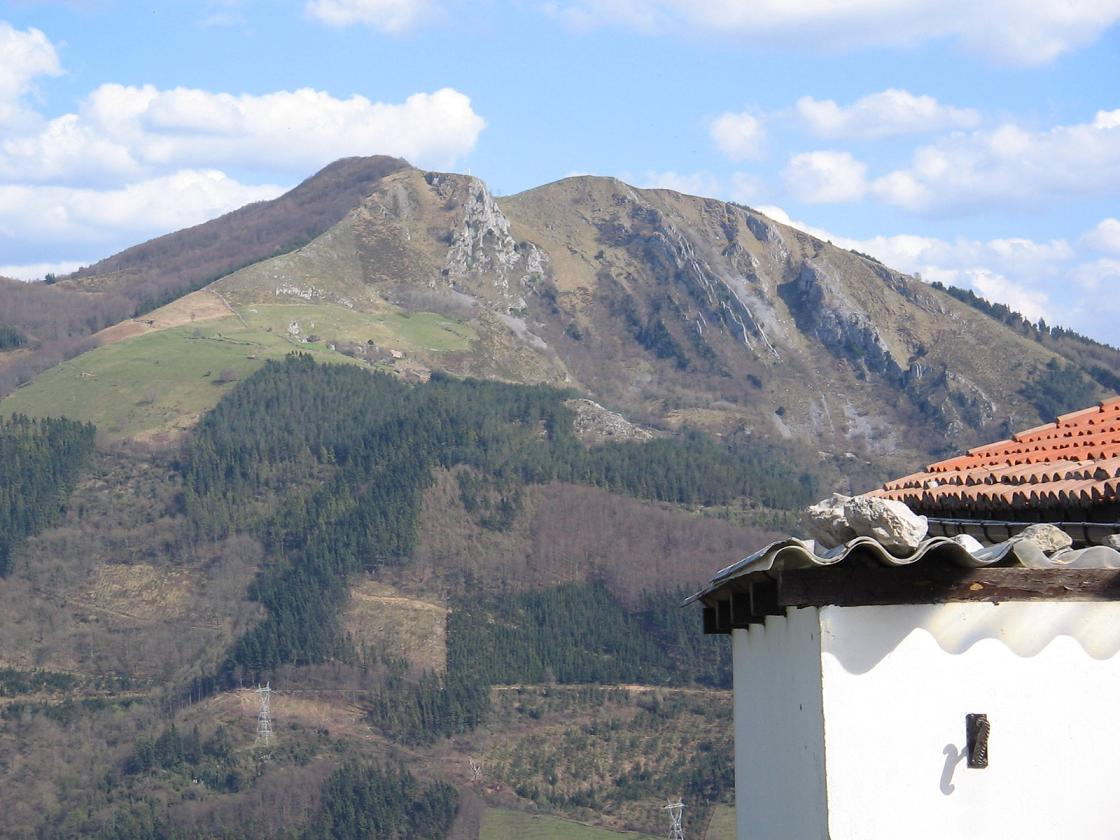
Uzturre from the west

Uzturre is a mountain in Gipuzkoa, in the Basque Country of Spain. Towering over Tolosa at around 730 m (2,400 ft) high and part of the Uzturre-Ipuliño mountain range, this mountain remains a popular sight for locals.
