= Errezil =

Coordinates: 43°9′54″N 2°10′27″W

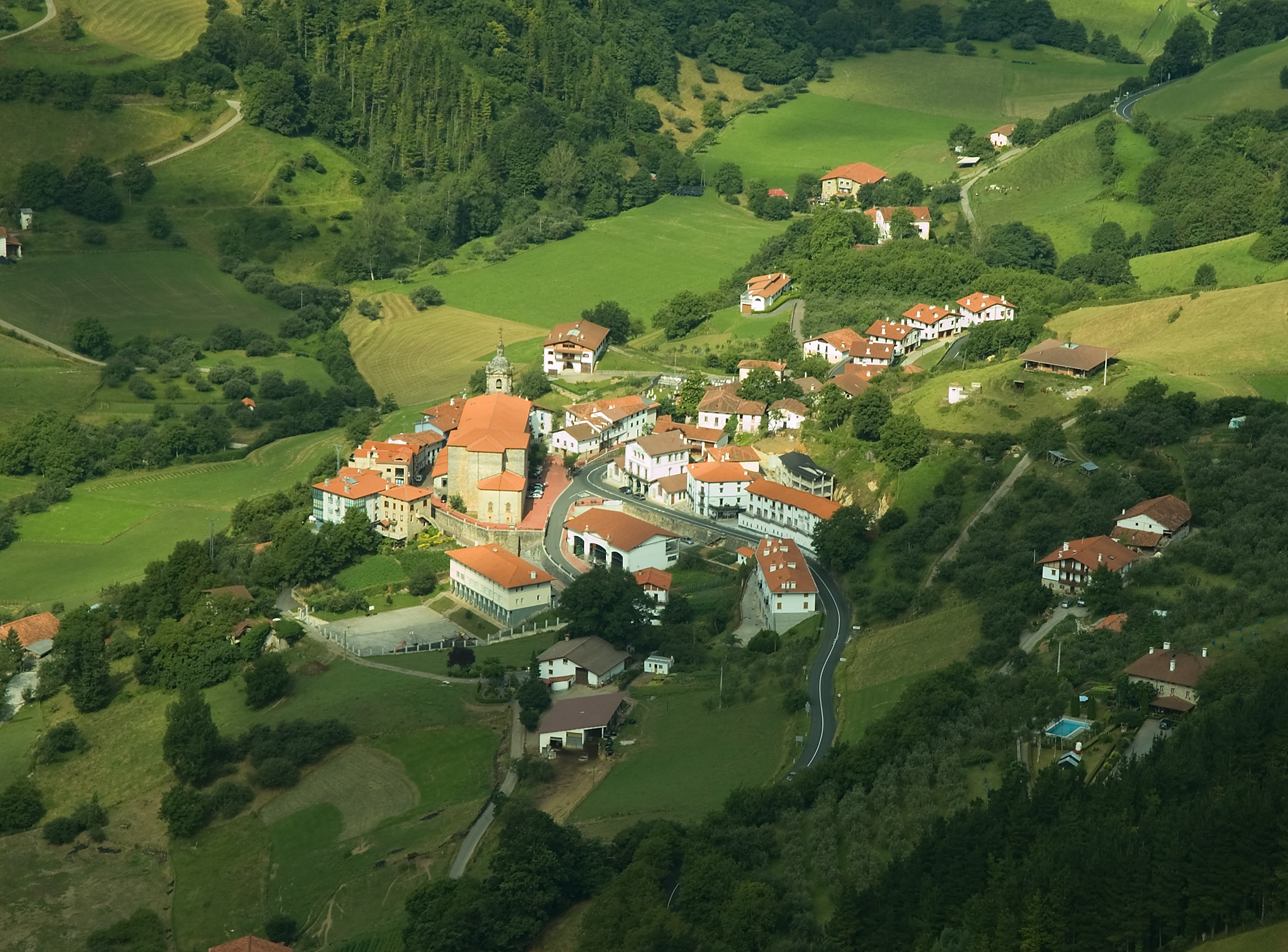
- Bird's eye view of Errezil

- Location in Spain.
- Country: Spain
- Autonomous community: Gipuzkoa

Area
  - Total: 32.46 km^{2} (12.53 sq mi)
- Elevation: 304 m (997 ft)

Population (2025-01-01)
  - Total: 588
  - Density: 18.1/km^{2} (46.9/sq mi)
- Time zone: UTC+1 (CET)
  - Summer (DST): UTC+2 (CEST)
- Website: www.errezil.eus

Errezil (Spanish: Régil) is a town in the province of Gipuzkoa in the autonomous community of Basque Country, located in the north of Spain. According to the 2016 Basque sociological survey, Errezil has the largest percentage of Basque language speakers of any municipality in the Basque Country, with over 90% of Errezil respondents reporting Basque as their first language and/or reporting speaking Basque at home.
