= Asteasu =

Coordinates: 43°11′34″N 2°5′43″W

- Location in Spain.
- Country: Spain
- Autonomous community: Gipuzkoa

Area
  - Total: 16.76 km^{2} (6.47 sq mi)

Population (2025-01-01)
  - Total: 1,566
  - Density: 93.44/km^{2} (242.0/sq mi)
- Time zone: UTC+1 (CET)
  - Summer (DST): UTC+2 (CEST)
- Website: www.asteasu.eus

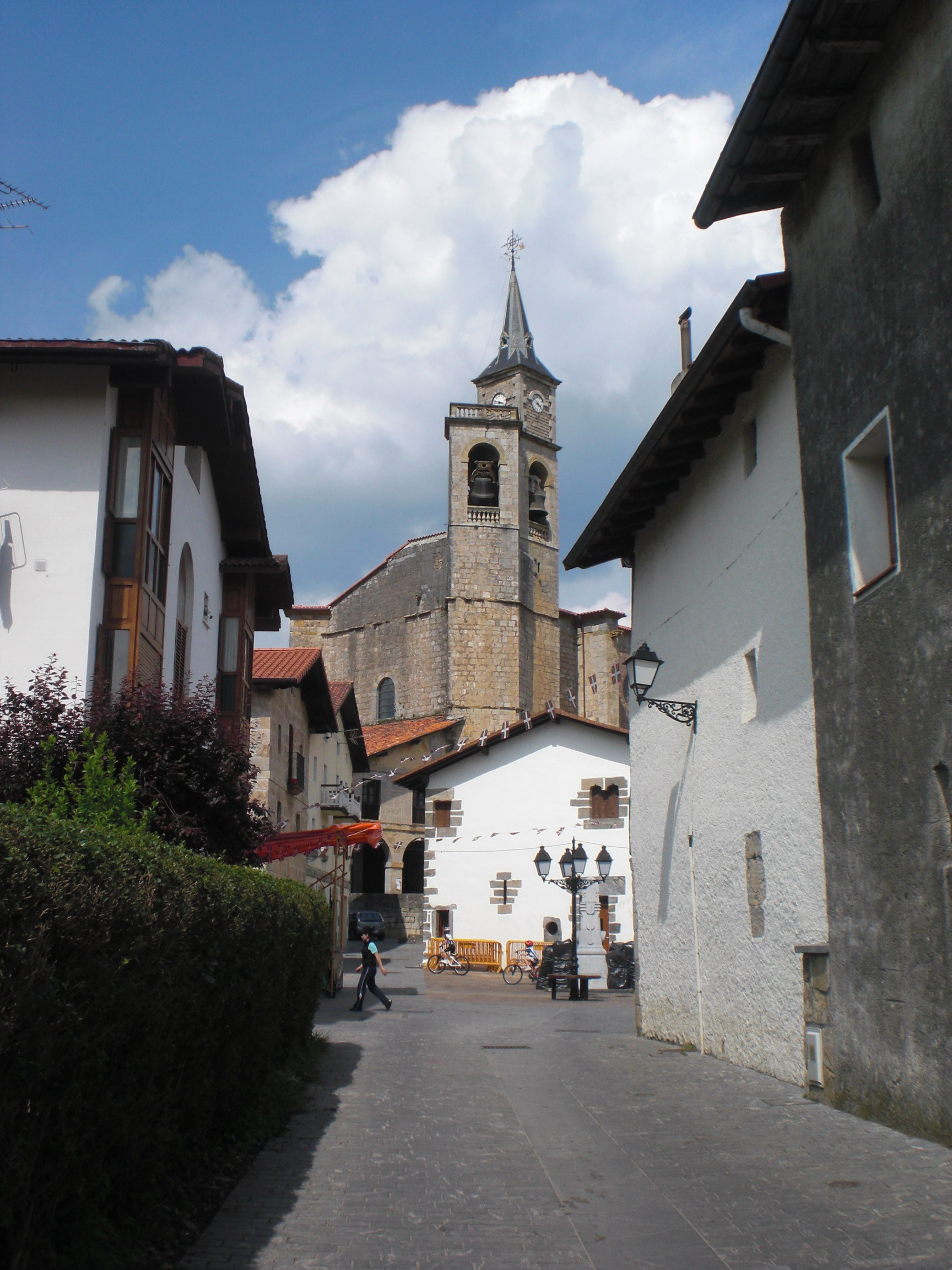
Church of San Pedro in the Elizmendi district of Asteasu.

Asteasu ([as̺teas̺u]) is a town located in the province of Gipuzkoa, in the autonomous community of Basque Country, in the north of Spain.
