= A Village Affair =

A Village Affair may refer to:

- A Village Affair (novel), a 1989 novel by Joanna Trollope
- A Village Affair (film), a 1995 British television film, based on the novel
