= Emmeline Pethick-Lawrence =

British suffragist and pacifist (1867–1954)

The Right Honourable The Lady Pethick-Lawrence
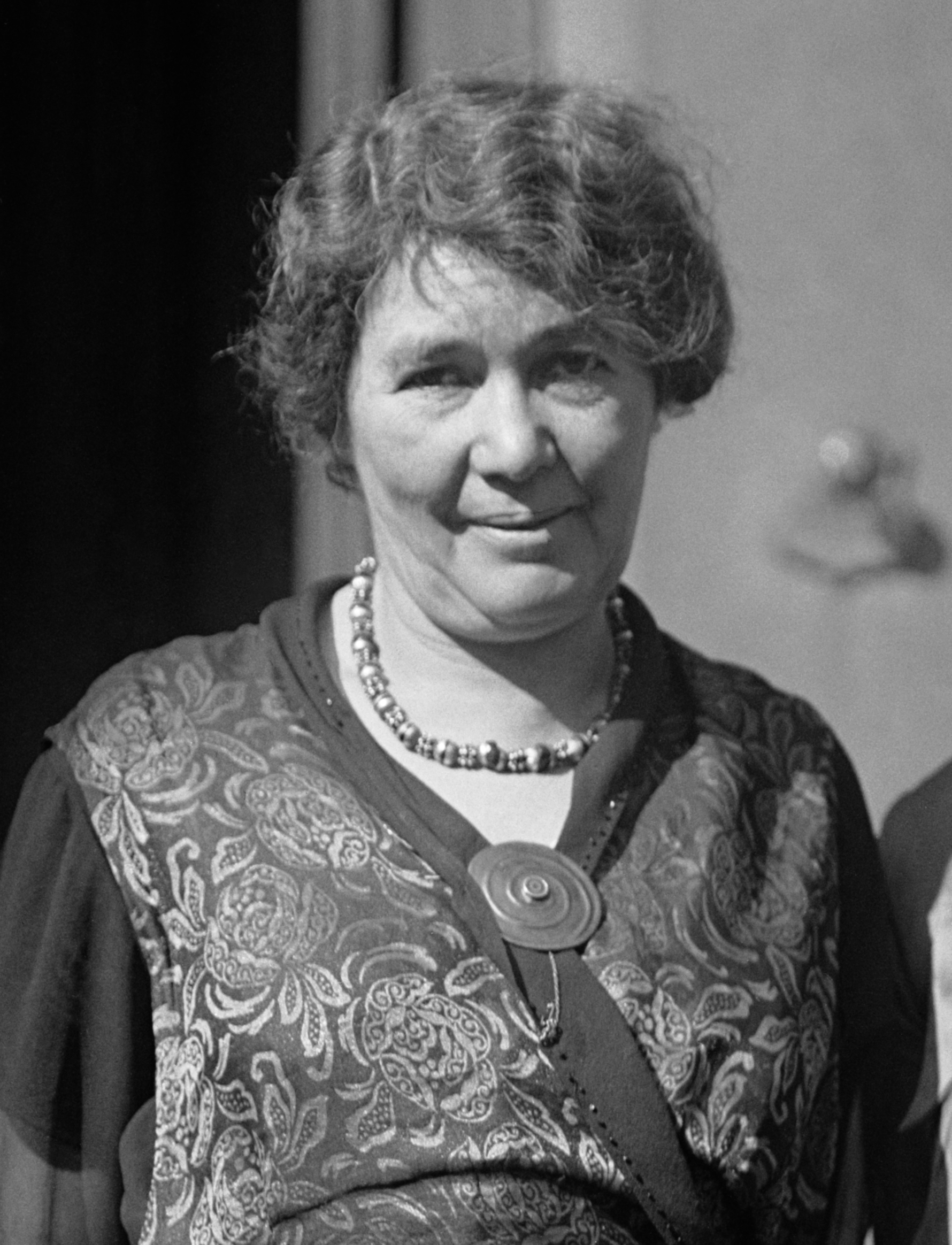
- Pethick-Lawrence, c. 1920
- Born: Emmeline Pethick; 21 October 1867; Clifton, Bristol, England
- Died: 11 March 1954 (aged 86); Gomshall, Surrey, England
- Education: Greystone House
- Employer: West London Methodist Mission
- Organisation(s): Espérance Club, Women's International League for Peace and Freedom, No More War Movement, The Suffragette Fellowship, Women's Freedom League
- Known for: Campaign for women's suffrage, co-founder of Votes for Women.
- Political party: Women's Social and Political Union, United Suffragists, Labour Party
- Spouse: Frederick Pethick-Lawrence, 1st Baron Pethick-Lawrence (m. 1901)
- Relatives: Dorothy Pethick (sister); Nellie Crocker (cousin)

Emmeline Pethick-Lawrence, Baroness Pethick-Lawrence (née Pethick; 21 October 1867 – 11 March 1954) was a British women's rights activist, suffragist and pacifist. She was a leading member and treasurer of the Women's Social and Political Union (WSPU), organised WSPU's first Week of Self-Denial and founded and edited the publication Votes for Women. She was ousted from the WSPU for her opposition to more militant action and founded the United Suffragists. She was one of the first members of the Women's International League for Peace and Freedom (WILPF) and she led a campaign against the naval blockade on Germany during World War I.

== Early life ==
Pethick-Lawrence was born in 1867 in Clifton, Bristol as Emmeline Pethick. Her father, Henry Pethick, of Cornish farming stock, was a businessman and merchant of South American hide, who became owner of the Weston Gazette, and a Weston town commissioner. She was the second of 13 children, five who died in infancy, and her younger sister, Dorothy Pethick (the tenth child), was also a suffragist.

Pethick was sent away to the Greystone House boarding school in Devizes, Wiltshire, at the age of eight. She was reluctant to conform from an early age and got into trouble frequently at school. She was then educated at private schools in England, France and Germany.

== Early career ==
From 1891 to 1895, Pethick worked as a "sister of the people" for the West London Methodist Mission at Cleveland Hall, near Fitzroy Square, having been inspired by Walter Besant's book The Children of Gibeon (1886). She ran a girls' club at the mission with Mary Neal and they became friends and lived together.

In 1895, she and Neal left the mission to co-found the Espérance Club, with support from the evangelical Christian socialist Mark Guy Pearse. The club for young women and girls would not be subject to the constraints of the mission, and could experiment with dance and drama. Pethick also started Maison Espérance, a dressmaking cooperative with a minimum wage, an eight-hour day and a holiday scheme, and was founder of the Social Settlement for Girls from the East End of London.

== Marriage ==
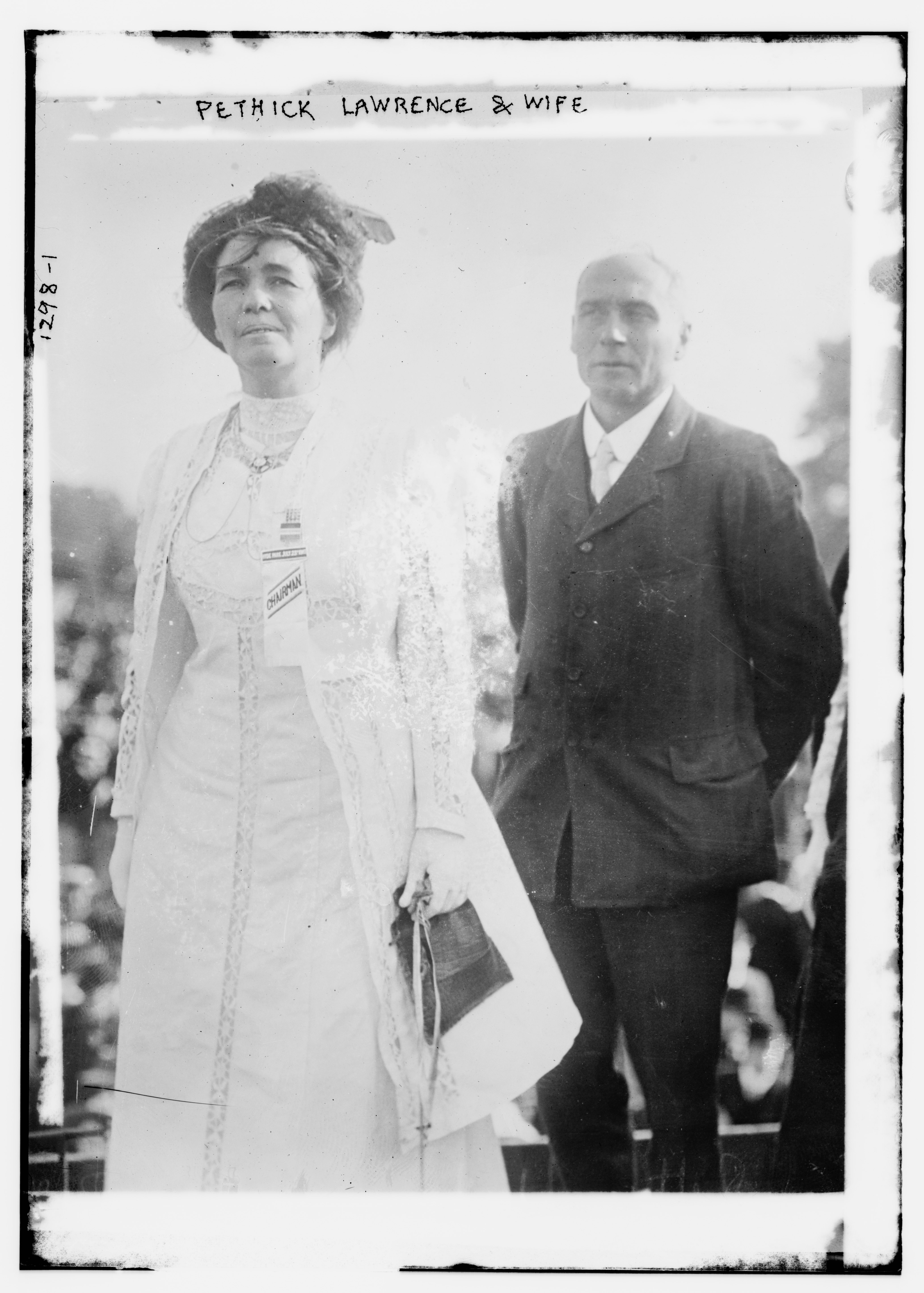
The Pethick-Lawrences

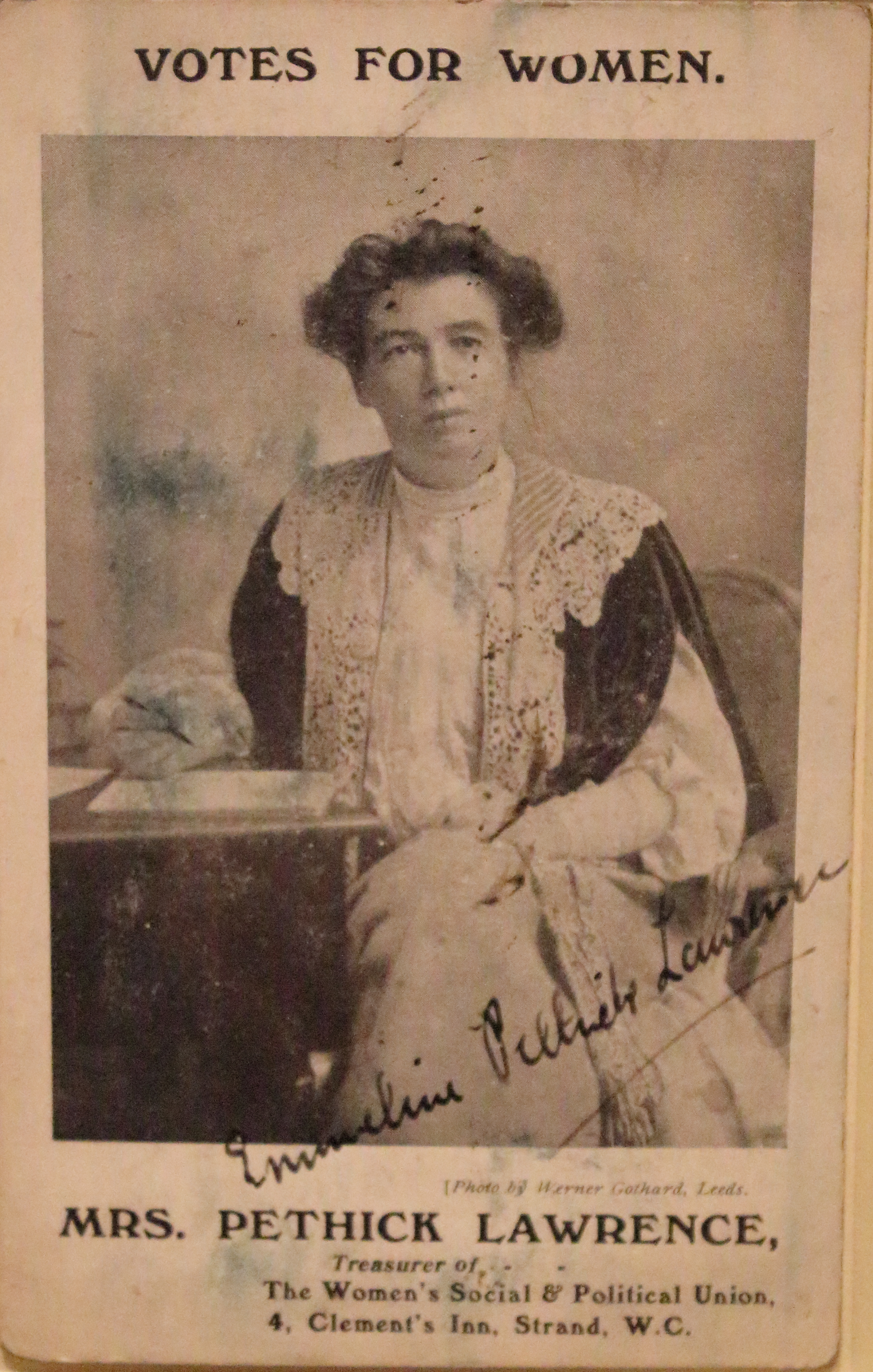
Signed postcard of Pethick-Lawrence from 1907

Pethick met wealthy barrister Frederick William Lawrence in 1899 at Percy Alden's Mansfield House settlement in Canning Town. She feared that a conventional marriage with him would curtail her independence and prevent her from her social service work, so turned down his first marriage proposal. After a second proposal, they married on 2 October 1901 at Canning Town Hall, three weeks before her 34th birthday.

After the marriage, the couple took the hyphenated joint surname Pethick-Lawrence as a gesture of equality, and kept separate bank accounts to give them financial autonomy. They moved to Holmwood, near Dorking and also shared a London flat. Between 1906 and 1912 Holmwood would become a central meeting place for leaders of the suffrage campaign and a refuge where suffragettes could recover from forcible feeding. On their first wedding anniversary, Frederick gave her the key to a private flat on the roof of Clement's Inn for her own private use.

== Women's suffrage activism ==
During a visit to South Africa with her husband, Pethick-Lawrence read about Christabel Pankhurst and Annie Kenney's protest and unfurling a banner declaring "Votes for Women" at the Manchester Free Trade Hall in October 1905, and their subsequent arrest. Back in Britain, Pethick-Lawrence became a member of the Suffrage Society and was introduced to Emmeline Pankhurst by politician Keir Hardie in 1906. Pethick-Lawrence became treasurer of the Women's Social and Political Union (WSPU), which Pankurst had founded in 1903, and raised £134,000 over six years. Her husband and Keir Hardie also donated funds to pay off the organisations debts and she insisted that her friend and chartered accountant Alfred Sayers be appointed to audit the WSPU finances.

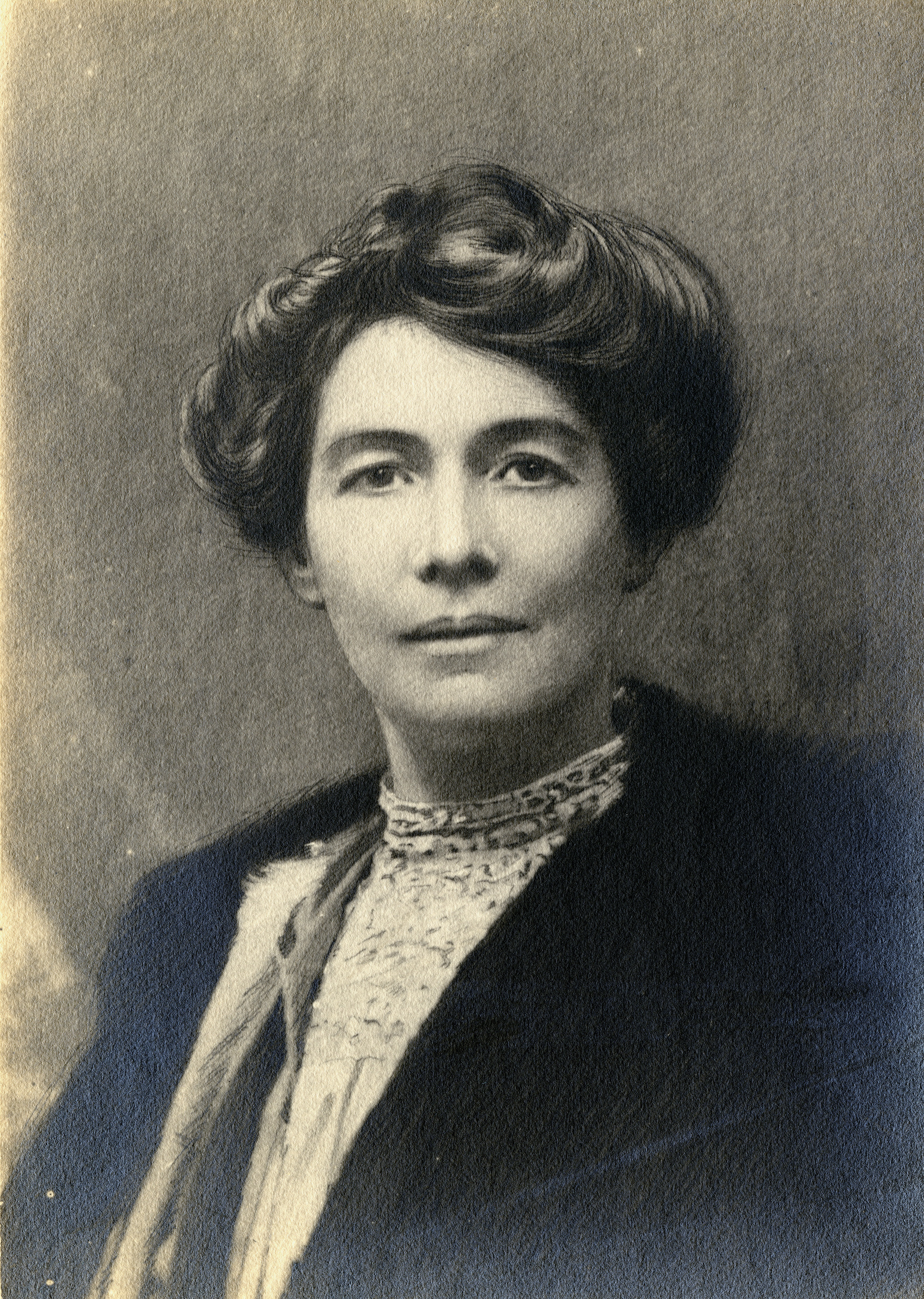
Pethick-Lawrence around 1910

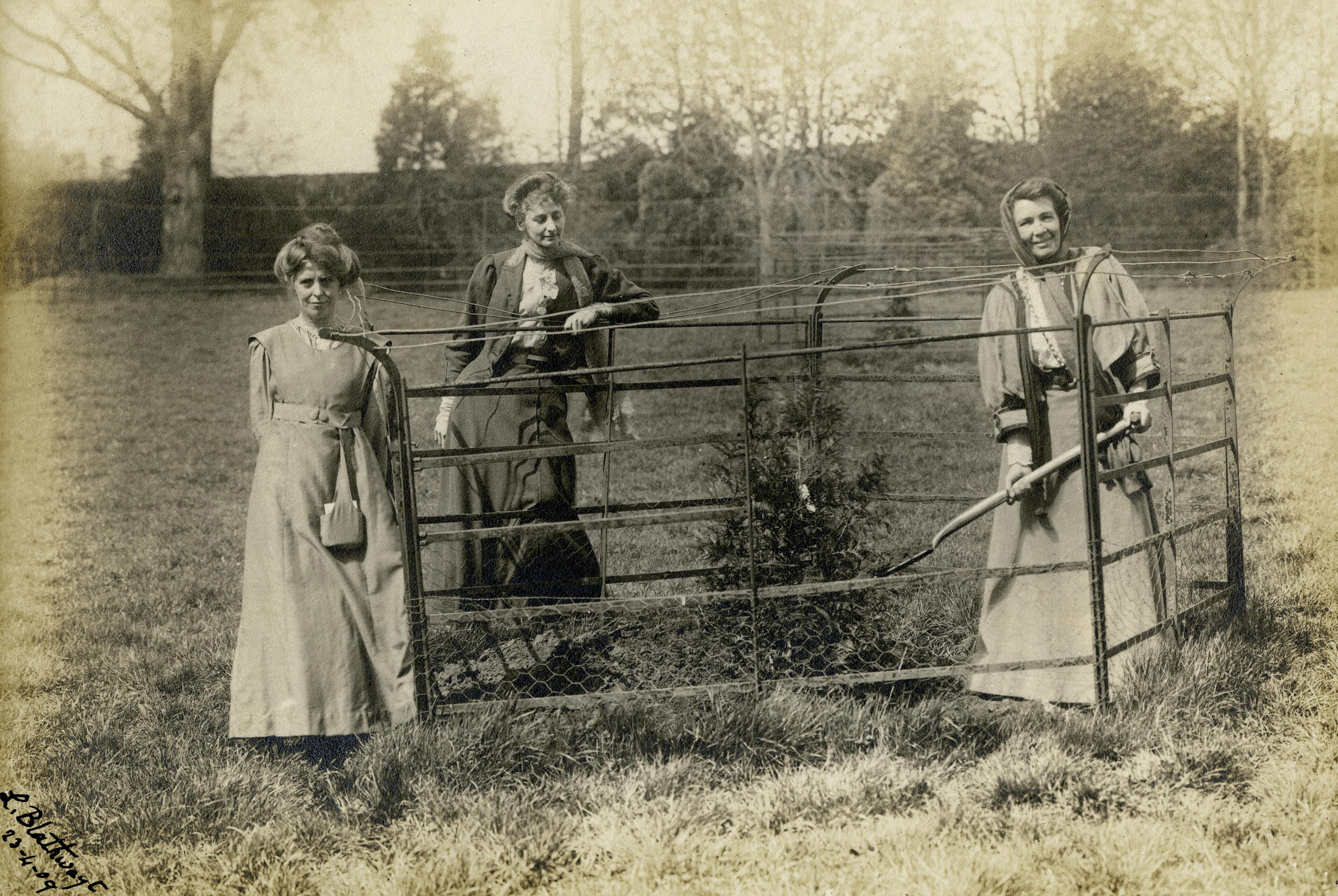
Annie Kenney, Constance Lytton and Emmeline Pethick Lawrence during tree planting at Eagle House in 1909

Christabel Pankhurst lived with the Pethick-Lawrences for five years in London and in Surrey. Pethick-Lawrence attended a number of protests and events with the Pankhursts. In October 1906, she was arrested with Emmeline Pankhurst for "causing a disturbance" outside the House of Commons. As they both refused to pay the £10 fine they were sent to HM Holloway Prison. She also participated in the aborted visit to the Prime Minister in late June 1908, along with Jessie Stephenson, Florence Haig, Maud Joachim and Mary Phillips, after which there was some violent treatment of women protestors, and a number of arrests.

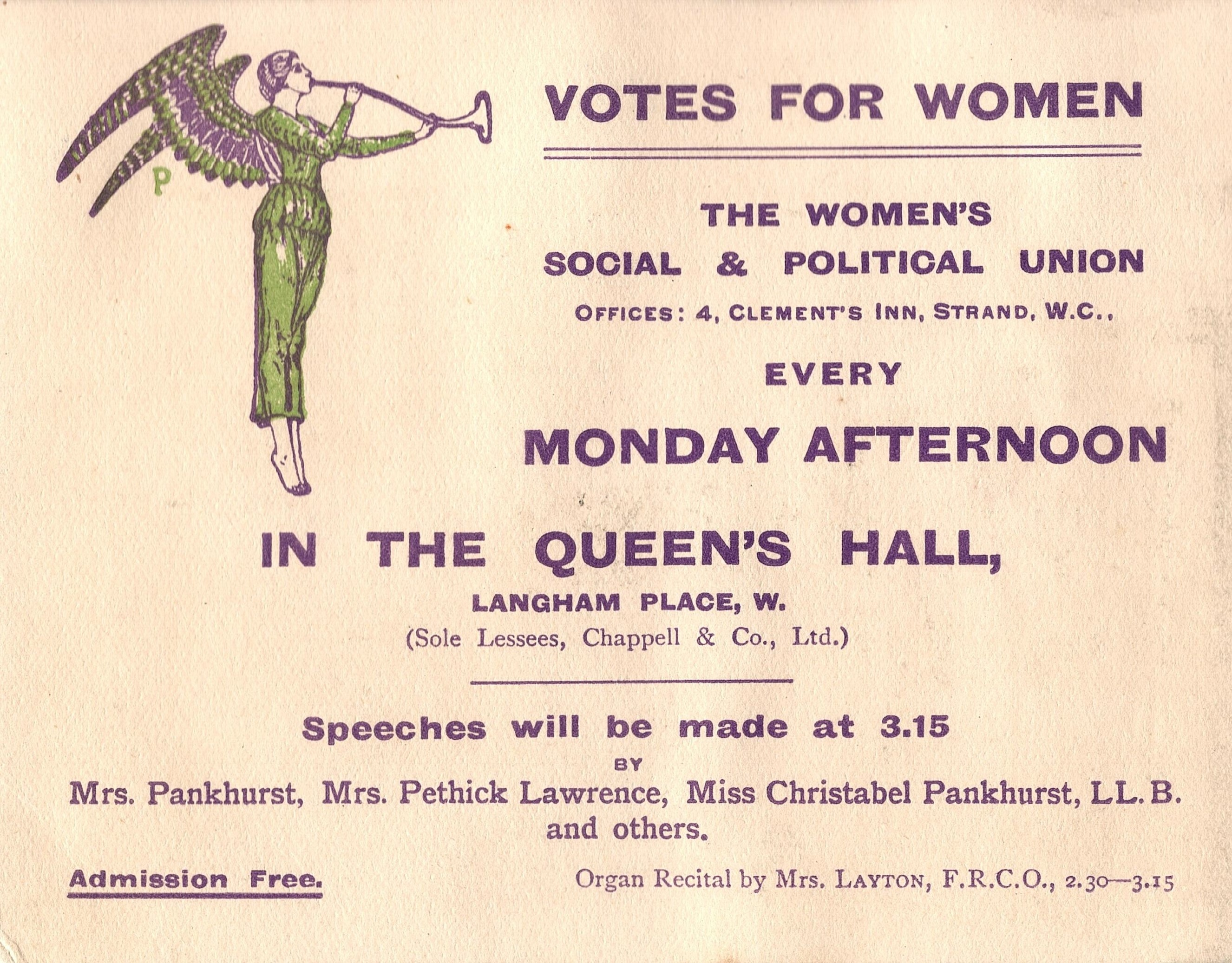
Ticket to Monday afternoon meetings at the Queen's Hall, Langham Place, with Pethick-Lawrence listed as speaking

In 1908, together with Beatrice Sanders and Mrs Knight, Pethick-Lawrence organised WSPU's first Week of Self-Denial, where supporters of the suffragette movement were asked to go without certain necessities for a week, donating the money saved to the WSPU. She chose the suffragette campaigning colours of purple, white and green.

Pethick-Lawrence spoke at the Women's Sunday at Hyde Park on 21 June 1908, alongside Flora Drummond, Gladice Keevil, Edith New, Emmeline Pankhurst, Christabel Pankhurst, Adela Pankhurst, and other activists. In 1909, she spoke in support for women's suffrage at the Royal Albert Hall. She often visited Eagle House to recover her health after periods in prison, and on 23 April 1909 she planted a tree at "Annie's Arboretum." Emily Blathwayt wrote in her diary that "it was a beautiful day for tree planting."

In 1911, Pethick-Lawrence took part in the suffrage boycott of the government's census survey by graffitiing votes for women on her enumeration form. She was arrested again in November 1911.

Pethick-Lawrence founded and edited the publication Votes for Women with her husband from 1907. It was adopted as the official newspaper of the Women's Social and Political Union (WSPU), already the leading militant suffragette organisation in the country. The couple was arrested and imprisoned in 1912 for conspiracy following demonstrations that involved breaking windows, even though they had disagreed with that form of action. She was force fed during this period of imprisonment.

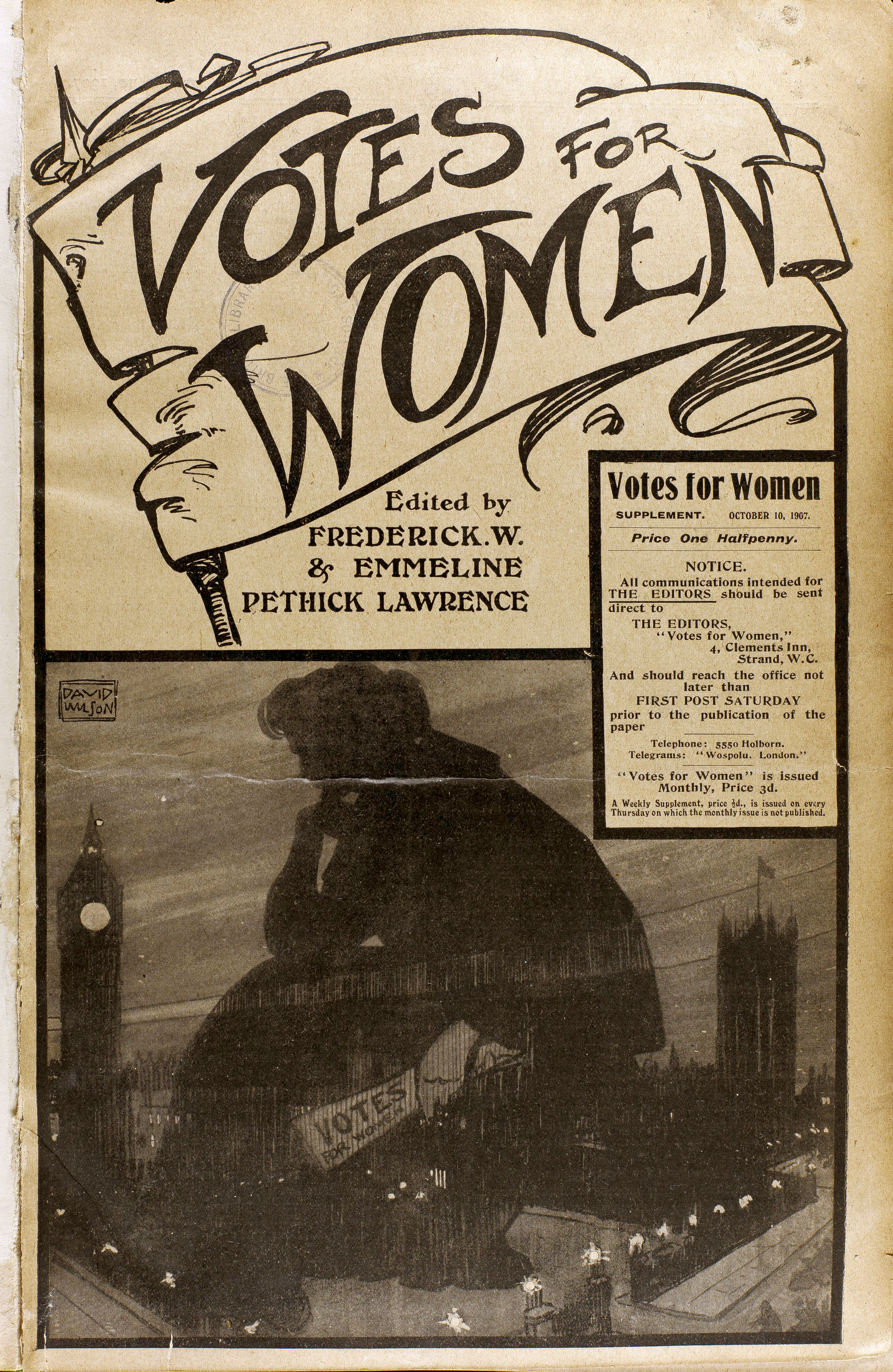
Votes for Women, the suffragette newspaper founded by the Pethick-Lawrences

In April 1913, Frederick Pethick-Lawrence was made bankrupt after he refused to pay the £900 costs of the prosecutions of Emmeline Pethick-Lawrence, himself and Emmeline Pankhurst in the Old Bailey for conspiracy to commit property damage. The Irish Times noted that "this step does not mean that Mr Pethick-Lawrence is insolvent, because he is a wealthy man. The government sent bailiffs to the Pethick-Lawrence's homes and when their belongings were auctioned most of their possessions were bought back by friends and supporters. Whilst the Pethick-Lawrences were imprisoned, Evelyn Sharp briefly assumed the editorship of the Votes for Women newspaper. After being released from prison, the Pethick-Lawrences recuperated with Emmeline's brother in Canada. The Pethick-Lawrences were ousted from the WSPU by Emmeline Pankhurst and her daughter Christabel Pankhurst, because of their ongoing disagreement over the more radical and militant forms of activism that the Pethick-Lawrences opposed. Her sister Dorothy Pethick also left the WSPU in protest at their treatment, having previously taken part and been imprisoned for militant action.

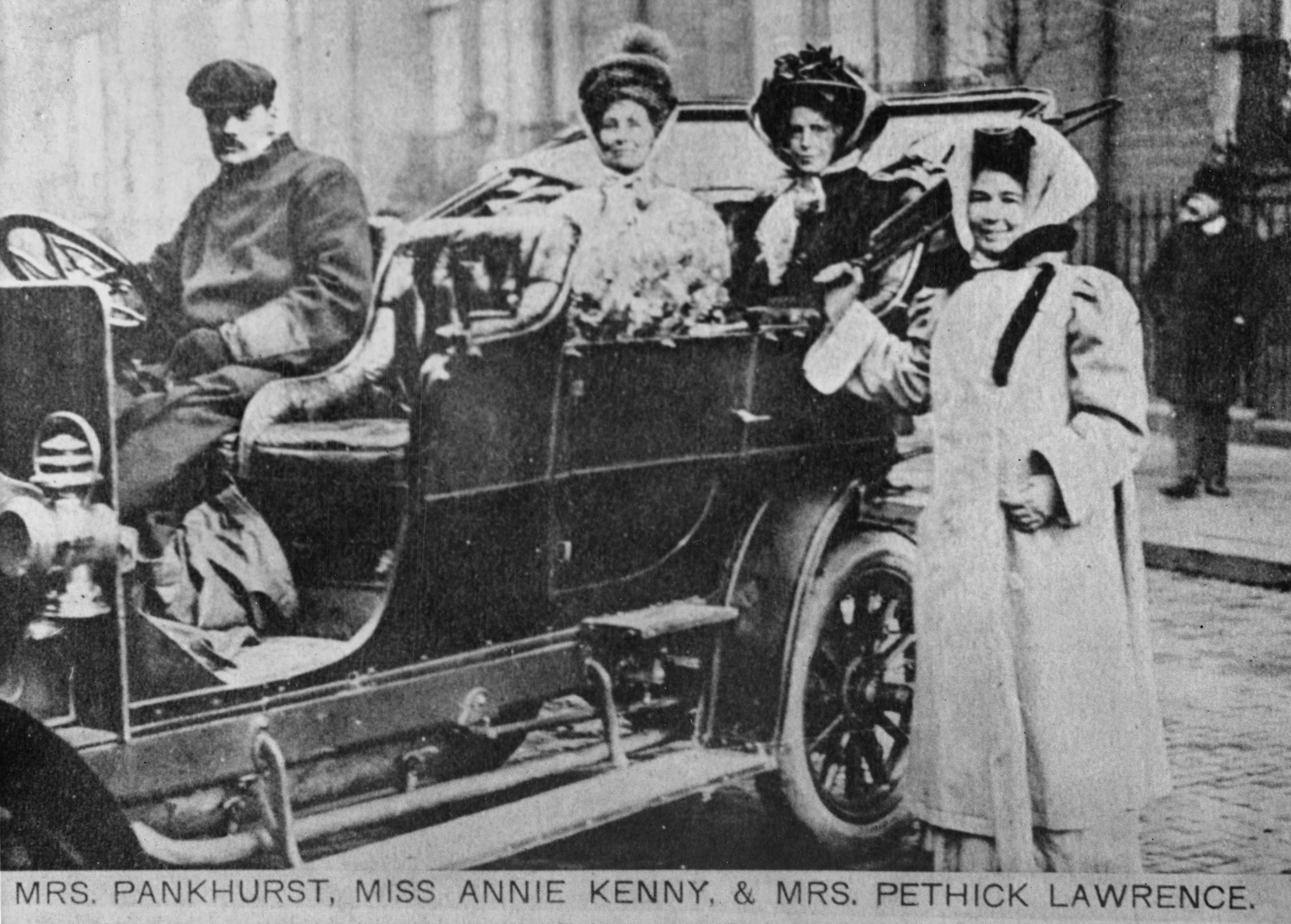
Emmeline Pankhurst, Annie Kenny and Emmeline Pethick-Lawrence c. 1912

The Pethick-Lawrences then joined Agnes Harben and others starting the United Suffragists, which took over the publication of Votes for Women and was open to women and men, militants and non-militants alike. The Suffragette replaced Votes for Women as the paper of the WSPU.

== Pacifism and election campaigns ==
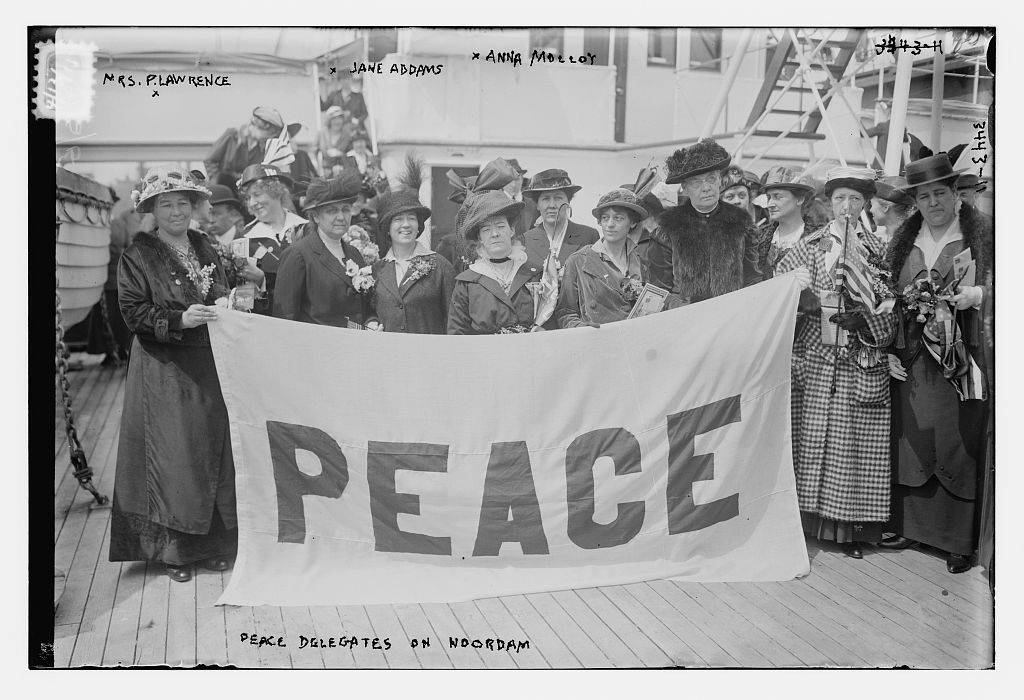
Pethick-Lawrence, left, with Women at the Hague in 1915, including Jane Addams and Annie E. Molloy

The Pethick-Lawrences and the Pankhurts also had opposing views on war. Pethick-Lawrence described peace as "the highest effort of the human brain applied to the organisation of the life and being of the peoples of the world on the basis of cooperation." In 1914, she embarked on a speaking tour in America, speaking on the outbreak of World War I, the impact of war on women and feminist pacifism.

In April 1915, Aletta Jacobs, a suffragist in the Netherlands, invited suffrage members from around the world to an International Congress of Women in The Hague. Pethick-Lawrence was one of the three female British attendees. At the conference, the Women's International League for Peace and Freedom (WILPF) was formed and Pethick-Lawrence became a member. As a pacifist, Pethwick-Lawrence was amongst the women who encouraged Jane Addams to take leadership over the peace movement in America, along with Carrie Champan Catt and Rosika Schwimmer.

When back in England, she led a campaign against the naval blockade on Germany. She supported the Six Point Group and Open Door Council. Her husband Frederick worked on a farm in Sussex as a conscientious objector and was a founding member of the Union of Democratic Control (UDC). At the end of the war, she deplored the terms of the Treaty of Versailles.

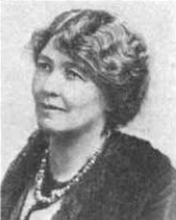
Emmeline Pethick-Lawrence, 1921

When the American activist Alice Paul visited England in 1921, she met with Pethick-Lawrence and Lady Margaret Rhondda to form an Internal Advisory Committee for the American National Women's Party, before travelling on to France.

In 1919, when women were first permitted to stand in elections, Pethick-Lawrence stood as a Labour candidate for Rusholme in Manchester. She called for "better houses, better food, pure milk, a public service of health, provision of midwives and also pensions for widowed mothers." She was not elected, winning a sixth of the vote. Her husband was later elected Member of Parliament (MP) for Leicester West in 1923.

When the Representation of the People (Equal Franchise) Act was passed into law in 1928, Pethick-Lawrence and her husband were invited to join a celebratory breakfast held at Hotel Cecil in London. The Manchester Guardian reported that she gave a speech in tribute to four prominent women's suffrage activists who died before the vote was finally won on equal terms: Emmeline Pankhurst, Emily Davidson, Constance Lytton and Anne Cobden-Sanderson.

== Later years ==
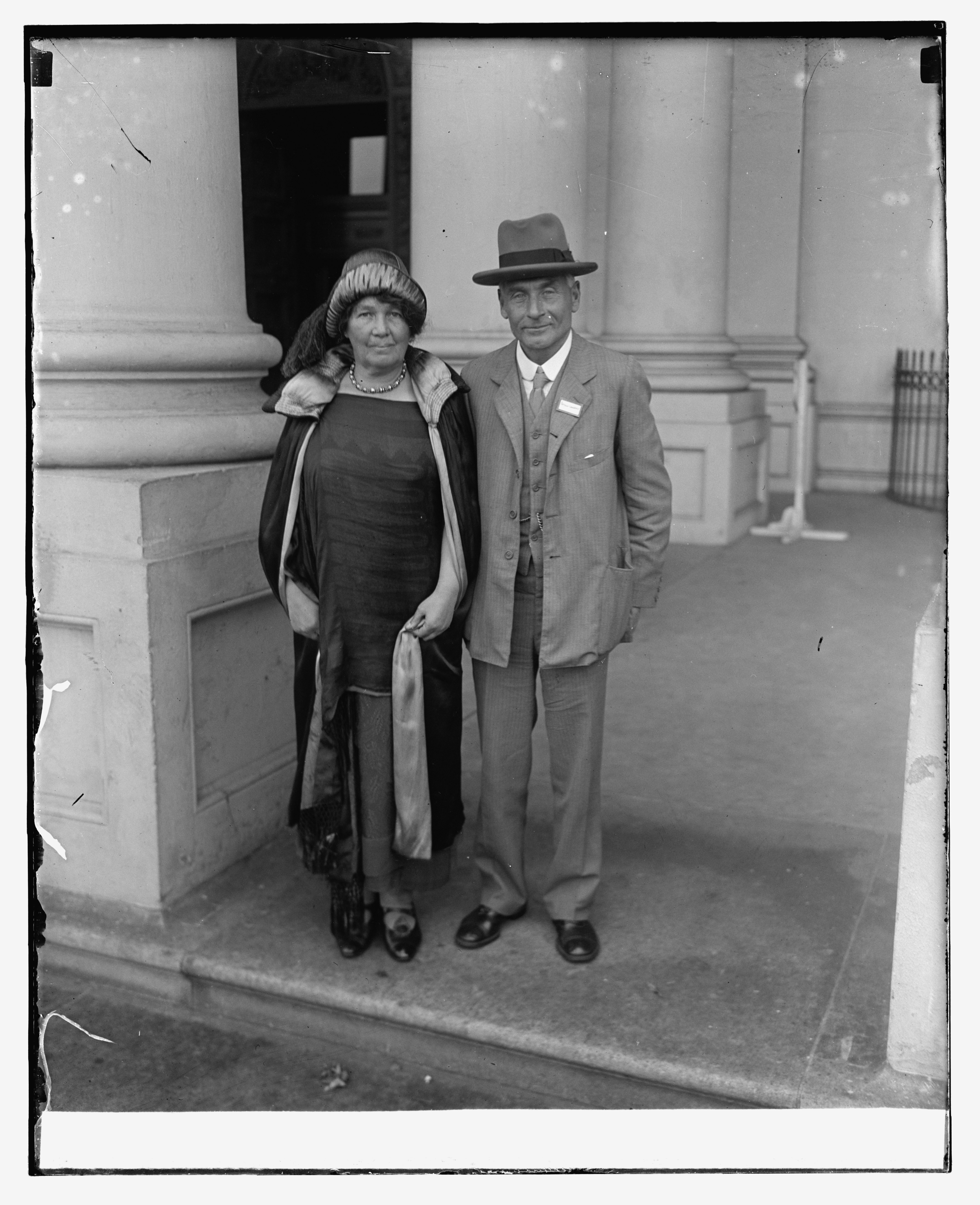
Emmeline and her husband Frederick Pethick-Lawrence in 1925

In 1938, Pethick-Lawrence published her memoirs, My Part in a Changing World, which discussed the radicalisation of the suffrage movement just before World War I and how the women's and peace movements were closely allied in England.

Pethick-Lawrence was involved in the setting up of the Suffragette Fellowship with Edith How-Martyn to document the women's suffrage movement. She was also involved with the Women's League of Unity, alongside Flora Drummond, which attempted to establish a women's newspaper in 1938-1939. She became the president of the Women's Freedom League (WFL) from 1926 to 1935, and was elected its president in honour in 1953. She was also involved in the campaign led by Marie Stopes to provide birth-control to working class women.

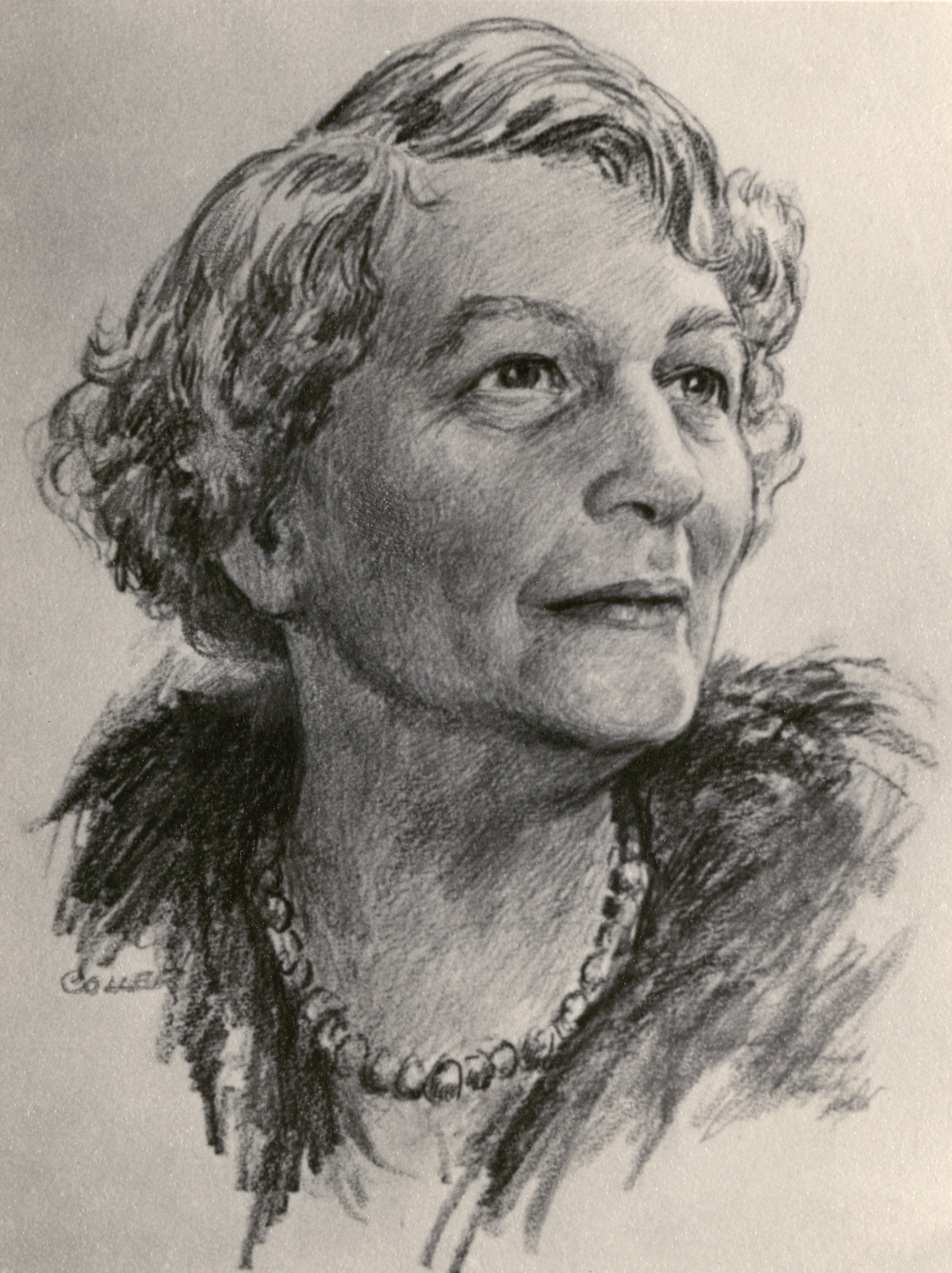
Drawing of Pethick-Lawrence in the 1930s

As well as campaigning, she travelled extensively with her husband, including to India when he was appointed as Clement Attlee's Secretary of State for India. Frederick became a long time friend of Mahatma Gandhi. In 1945, she became Lady Pethick-Lawrence when her husband was made a Baron.

In 1950, she had a serious accident which ended her campaigning. She was cared for by her husband. Pethick-Lawrence died at her home in Fourways, Gomshall, Surrey, in 1954 following a heart attack.

== Suffrage interviews ==
In 1976 the historian, Brian Harrison, conducted various interviews related to the Pethwick-Lawrence's as part of the Suffrage Interviews project, titled Oral evidence on the suffragette and suffragist movements: the Brian Harrison interviews. Elizabeth Kempster was employed as their housekeeper in 1945 following an interview at Lincoln's Inn, and worked at their home, Fourways, in Surrey, where Sylvia Pankhurst was a frequent visitor. She talks about Pethick-Lawrence's character, appearance, interests and frailty. Gladys Groom-Smith, interviewed in June and August 1976, was secretary to the Pethick-Lawrence's, working alongside Esther Knowles who trained her. She talks about Pethick-Lawrence's role as a speaker in the No More War Movement, and the Pethick-Lawrence's work and marriage, lifestyle and friendships, including with Henry Harben and Victor Duval. Harrison also interviewed the niece of Esther Knowles, who recalled her Aunt's relationship with the Pethick-Lawrence's and her work for them.

== Posthumous recognition ==
Pethick-Lawrence's name and picture (and those of 58 other women's suffrage supporters) are on the plinth of the statue of Millicent Fawcett in Parliament Square, London, unveiled in 2018.

In 2018, the London School of Economics renamed three of its key campus buildings after central figures in the British suffrage movement, including Pethick-Lawrence. The newly named buildings were unveiled in a ceremony by HRH Sophie Windsor, then Countess of Wessex.

A blue plaque was unveiled in Pethick-Lawrence's honour by Weston-super-Mare Town Council and Weston Civic Society in March 2020. It was placed on a wall Lewisham House, Weston-super-Mare (known as 'Trewartha' when she lived there for fourteen years as a child).

== Foundations, organisations and settlements ==
- Espérance Club
- Guild of the Poor Brave Things
- Independent Labour Party
- Kibbo Kift
- West London Methodist Mission
- Women's International League
- Women's Social and Political Union (WSPU)
- Women's International League for Peace and Freedom
- No More War Movement

== See also ==
- Hugh Price Hughes
- List of suffragists and suffragettes
- List of women's rights activists
- Mark Guy Pearse, whom Lady Pethick-Lawrence described as "the greatest influence upon the first half of my life".
- Women's suffrage organisations
