= Philip Bagwell =

Philip Bagwell (16 February 1914 – 17 February 2006) was a prolific and widely respected British labour and transport historian.

Born in Ventnor, on the Isle of Wight, he grew up in a radical tradition. His father, Philip William Bagwell (1885-1958), was a conscientious objector in the First World War, and although Bagwell rejected pacifism, he maintained a lifelong commitment to radical social causes associated with Christian socialism, a commitment that infused all his major published work.

Bagwell was a lifelong advocate of public transport and especially of the economic, social and cultural virtues of railway travel. He wrote the official history of the National Union of Railwaymen, published in two volumes in 1963 and 1982. His The Transport Revolution became essential reading on university economic and social history courses.

He spent most of his career (from 1951) at the Polytechnic of Central London (later the University of Westminster), where in 1972 he was given one of the first professorships created in the polytechnic sector of British higher education. He continued to write influential and impeccably researched books, pamphlets and articles on public and communal issues in transport policy in a period when official opinion in Britain was gradually swinging increasingly towards purely private emphases.

A committed Christian and an active Methodist, he also wrote the standard history of the West London Mission, British Methodism's most ambitious and extensive long-term project of service to the poor and disadvantaged in central London, and particularly associated with Donald Soper.

A researcher of tireless energy, at the time of his death, aged 92, he was writing a new book on global warming and transport policy, a topic he saw as of crucial moral and social significance for the future.

== Main publications ==
Books

- The Railwaymen: The History of the National Union of Railwaymen (London: Allen & Unwin, 1963)
- The Railway Clearing House in the British Economy 1842-1922 (London: Allen & Unwin, 1968)
- Britain and America: A Study of Economic Change, 1850-1939 (with G. E. Mingay) (London: Routledge, 1970. Japanese edn, 1970)
- Industrial Relations (Shannon: Irish University Press, 1974)
- The Transport Revolution from 1770 (London: Batsford, 1974. Second extended edn, London: Routledge, 1988)
- The Railwaymen, vol 2, The Beeching Era and After (London: Allen & Unwin, 1982)
- End of the Line: The Fate of British Railways under Thatcher (London: Verso, 1984. Japanese edn, 1985)
- Outcast London, A Christian Response: The West London Mission of the Methodist Church 1887-1987 (London: Epworth, 1987)
- Transport in Britain 1750-2000: From Canal Lock to Gridlock (with P. Lyth) (London: Hambledon, 2002)

“Prison Cell to Council Chamber” Philip S Bagwell (with Joan Lawley) (York: Ebro Press, 1994)

== Other sources ==
- On the Move: Essays in Labour and Transport History presented to Philip Bagwell (eds. C. Wrigley and J. Shepherd) (London: Hambledon Press, 1991)
