= Aga saga =

Literary genre of British family life

The Aga saga is a subgenre of the family saga genre of literature. The genre is named for the AGA cooker, a type of stored-heat oven that came to be popular in medium to large country houses in the UK after its introduction in 1929. It refers primarily to fictional family sagas dealing with British "middle-class country or village life". The nickname "Aga saga" is sometimes used condescendingly about this type of fiction. The term was incorporated into the Oxford Companion to English Literature in 2000.

== Characteristics ==
While the label has been applied to settings within other genres, it is typically interpreted to refer to "a tale of illicit rumpy-pumpy in the countryside" according to a 2007 article in The Observer. In setting, according to an earlier article in that paper, it offers a "gingham-checked world" associated with "thatched English villages" and "ladies in floral dresses". Guardian book critic Laura Wilson described an Aga saga setting as "complete with sprawling, untidy farmhouse (flagstones, dogs, Wellington boots, and much nursing of mugs of coffee)".

== Critical analyses ==
The Times, in a 2004 article, characterized the genre as the "older sister of the sex 'n' shopping romances". According to a critical analysis in The Independent, the genre rose to prominence in the 1990s not as a continuance of the celebration of "sex and shopping [that] reflected the materialism of the 1980s", but as a signal of "disillusionment with those values". Guardian Arts and Heritage correspondent Maev Kennedy described the genre poetically as encapsulating "the nostalgic yearning for an Arcadian idyll".

== Origin ==
The term was coined in 1992 by novelist Terence Blacker to describe specifically the work of Joanna Trollope, which not only inspired the label but popularized the type of literature typically so labeled. Trollope indicated in 2003 that "[t]he name itself indicates a provincial cosiness, and is patronising of the readers. A lot of what I write into the books is bleak and challenging but I will be the Queen of the Aga saga to my dying day. It's jolly annoying, but it is better than being the Queen of Hearts".

In 2003 The Guardian reported that Blacker had expressed both his respect for the author and his remorse for contributing the label, indicating that it was applied "early in her career and these tags are rather distorting and unfair", but Blacker later indicated in The Independent that "[a]lthough it must be bloody annoying for a writer to have her work reduced to a flip phrase, I have only used it once and in a perfectly respectable context. What happened to the term after that is no more my responsibility than it would be Trollope's if her jokey reference to a certain kind of serious fiction as 'grim lit' took hold". In 2005, Trollope indicated that she was "fairly tired of such an inaccurate and patronising tag". In the "Aga Saga" entry, Oxford Companion to English Literature exemplifies the genre by the work of Trollope, but notes that "by no means all her work fits the generally comforting implications of the label".
