= A Village Affair (film) =

- Genre: Drama; Romance
- Based on: A Village Affair by: Joanna Trollope
- Screenplay by: Alma Cullen
- Directed by: Moira Armstrong
- Starring: Sophie Ward; Kerry Fox; Nathaniel Parker; Jeremy Northam; Michael Gough; Claire Bloom
- Composer: Ilona Sekacz
- Country of origin: United Kingdom
- Original language: English

Production
- Executive producer: Jane Wellesley
- Cinematography: John Else
- Editor: Peter Delfgou
- Running time: 101 minutes
- Production companies: Warner Sisters Production; Carlton Television

Original release
- Network: ITV
- Release: 17 April 1995

A Village Affair is a 1995 British television film based on the 1989 eponymous novel by Joanna Trollope. It was broadcast by ITV on 17 April 1995. The film was directed by Moira Armstrong from a teleplay by Alma Cullen.

== Plot ==
Alice and Martin Jordan arrive with their three children to live in the quiet English village of Pitcombe, and all seems to be well at first. But there is a secret below the surface which begins to emerge after Alice meets Clodagh Unwin, the daughter of local landowner Sir Ralph Unwin.

== Cast ==
- Sophie Ward as Alice Jordan
- Kerry Fox as Clodagh Unwin
- Nathaniel Parker as Martin Jordan
- Jeremy Northam as Anthony Jordan
- Michael Gough as Sir Ralph Unwin
- Claire Bloom as Cecily Jordan
- Barbara Jefford as Lady Unwin
- Peter Jeffrey as Peter Morris
- Rosalie Crutchley as Lettice Deverel
- Philip Voss as Richard Jordan
- Heather Canning as Elizabeth Meadows

Keira Knightley appeared in the role of Alice's daughter, Natasha Jordan.

== Home media ==
A Village Affair was released on VHS in Europe by Odyssey Video Ltd. on 28 September 1997. The DVD was released by Odyssey on 30 June 2003.

The North American region DVD was released by Acorn Media on 26 May 2009.
