= Kingsway Hall =

Former Methodist church hall, later recording studio in London

Coordinates: 51.5159°N 0.1201°W

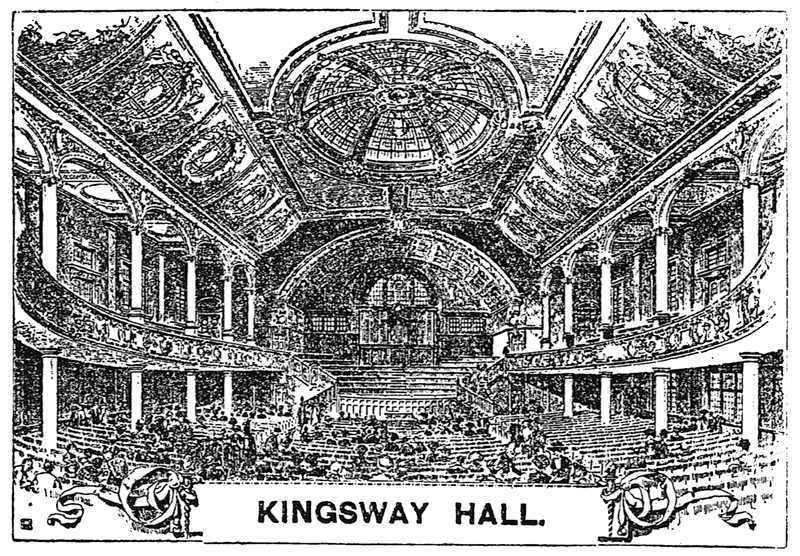
Kingsway Hall in 1925

The Kingsway Hall in Holborn, London, was the base of the West London Mission (WLM) of the Methodist Church, and eventually became one of the most important recording venues for classical music and film music. It was built in 1912 and demolished in 1998. Among the prominent Methodists associated with the Kingsway Hall was Donald Soper, who was Superintendent Minister at the West London Mission from 1936 until his retirement in 1978.

== Overview ==
Kingsway Hall took its name from the street on to which its main entrance opened. The address was West London Mission, 75 Kingsway, London WC2.

In 1899, the London County Council (LCC) was given the power to proceed with major slum clearance in the area between Holborn and the Strand. The Methodist Church had operated its West London Mission since 1887 occupying a number of rented buildings in Piccadilly, St James' Hall and Princes Hall, and the Strand, Exeter Hall.

These venues were steadily reclaimed as sites for new hotels, so eventually, in 1906, the church found a more permanent home for the Mission at 67 Great Queen Street, where there was a chapel. There had been a chapel there since at least 1709 but the Methodists moved in in 1789 and from time to time refurbished and expanded it. In April 1907 this chapel was renamed as Kingsway Hall, but the building was condemned by the LCC as part of the clearance.

It was then decided to join the development taking place on the new Kingsway road and build a new Mission including a spacious chapel. An idea of the nature of the area around Great Queen Street and Holborn just before the new Kingsway was built can be found in the book Old time Aldwych, the Kingsway and Neighbourhood by Charles Gordon, published in 1903 by T Fisher Unwin.

A new seven-storey building called Wesley House was home to the West London Mission from 1911 until 1972, when it merged with the Hinde Street Methodist Chapel (a merger not completed until 1982). Wesley House included a youth club, religious meeting rooms, a luncheon club, mission offices, and accommodation for resident staff. Adjacent to Wesley House, and with a frontage on to Kingsway, the Church also speculated by building the International Buildings, which was let to many tenants and was a source of much needed revenue to run the mission.

The mission was inaugurated at Wesley House on 6 December 1911, but Kingsway Hall, the chapel attached to Wesley House, required another year of construction. Although Kingsway Hall itself has been demolished, Wesley House remains today, no longer a mission, as do the International Buildings.

Foundation stones for Kingsway Hall were laid 24 April 1912 and the hall was completed with a ceremony on 6 December 1912. The hall included a raked floor with over 2,000 seats.

The organ, built in 1912 by J. J. Binns of Leeds, was inaugurated 4 April 1913 with half its cost of £1,500 being contributed by American steel magnate Andrew Carnegie. A fourth manual was added in 1924 by Messrs. Hill & Son and Norman & Beard, along with chimes and timpani. Gatty Sellars, the hall's organist at the time, gave the inaugural performance on the new organ. The organ was rebuilt in 1932 and remained in use until the closure of the hall. The Nigerian composer Fela Sowande was the organist of the hall from 1945. As soon as electrical recording began in the Hall, among the first recordings were those of the solo organ; some of these have been issued on CD by Amphion Records of Malton in Yorkshire.

Donald Soper (the well-known pacifist, later to become Baron Soper), became the Methodist minister of Kingsway Hall in 1936. When German air raids on London started in 1940, Soper opened a "rest and feeding centre" in Kingsway Hall's basement (not far from Holborn underground station). Here, the victims of the bombing could find refuge, and Soper and his family also lived there for a time. Until the end of 1944, Kingsway Hall ran a breakfast canteen. In one 6-month period alone, 26,232 breakfasts were served (and 34,178 cups of tea). At the request of the Ministry of Food, from 1942 Soper also organised the distribution of surplus vegetables from Covent Garden Market to the needy.

The Hall was used for public meetings as well as church services etc. One such meeting was held by the Free French on 18 June 1940 at which General Charles De Gaulle addressed them to encourage resistance to the very recent German invasion. On this same day, Winston Churchill addressed the House of Commons, giving his famous "Finest Hour" speech, in which he refers to the recently lost Battle of France and the forthcoming Battle of Britain. The speech was recorded at Abbey Road studios.

After the war, Kingsway Hall became an active venue for concerts and recording sessions, and was regarded as one of the best recording locations in the world. Its use for concerts and recordings continued until 1983 when it was acquired by the Greater London Council (GLC) and closed.

At the end of March 1983, the GLC purchased Wesley House and Kingsway Hall for the women's committee. Kingsway Hall was rapidly deteriorating, and an archaeological survey in August 1996 found that nothing significant about it was still present. Despite pleas from some musicians and record magazines, Kingsway was demolished in 1998 to make way for a hotel of the same name, which opened in 2000. The hotel's reception desk is in the approximate location where orchestra members once recorded.

== Recording at Kingsway Hall 1925–1984 ==
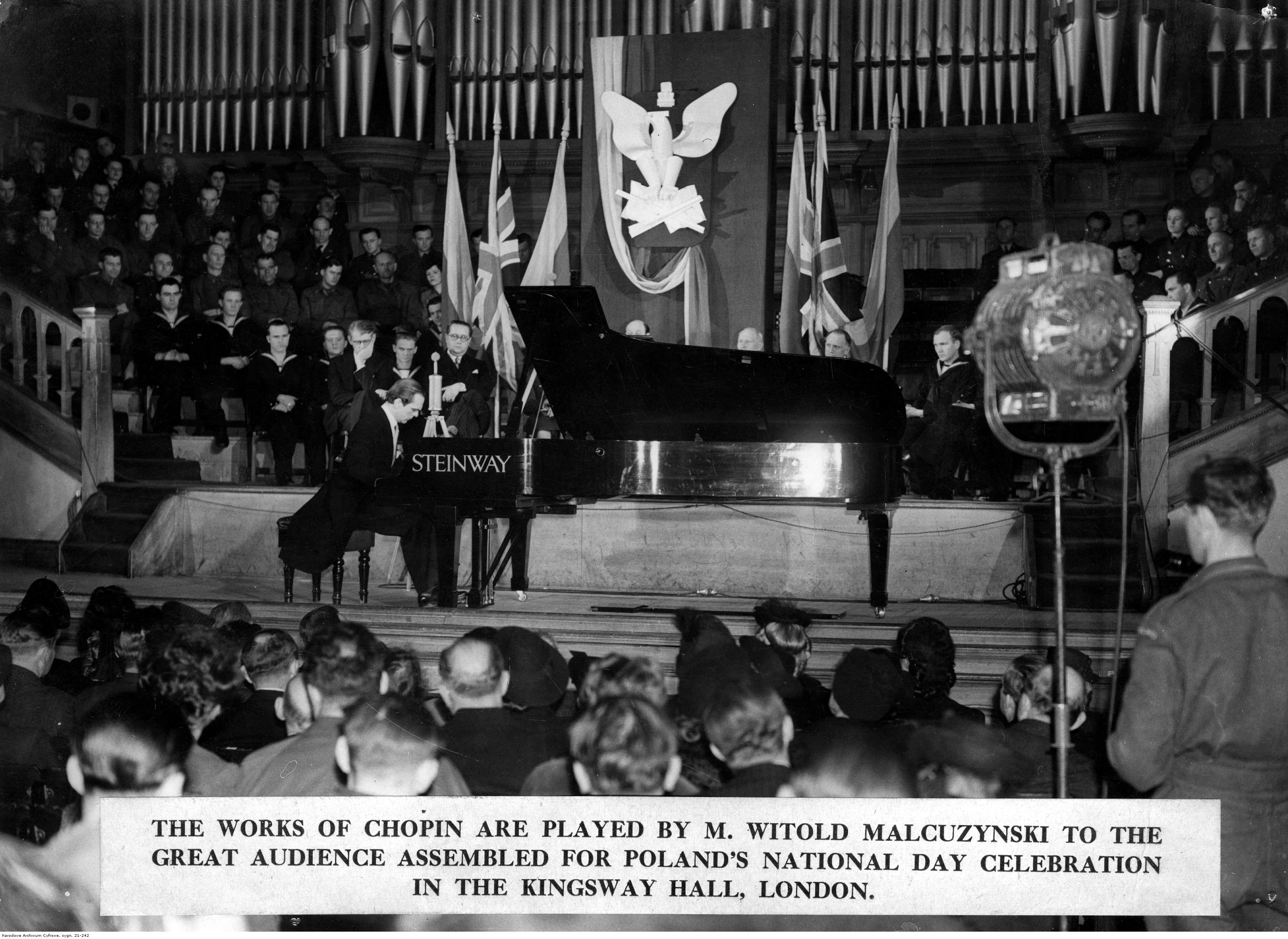
Kingsway Hall in 1940s, piano performance by Witold Małcużyński

Kingsway was built for evangelistic purposes, as a place of worship, not as a concert or recording hall. However, it was considered to have the finest acoustics in London for recording orchestral and choral repertory. The acoustics resulted more by accident than through conscious design. The size and shape of the space as well as the plastered walls and wooden floor all contributed, as did the large storage chamber below the hall. Musicians were enthusiastic about performing there since the hall allowed them to hear their own playing very well.

At the same time, they found other aspects of the hall difficult since nearby parking was scarce, it was cold in the winter, was dingy and dirty, and lacked food services. For recording engineers, there was also continual rumbling from the London Underground line interrupting recordings. Directly below Great Queen Street is the main line of the Underground Piccadilly line, which opened on 15 December 1906, and under Kingsway was a branch, the rail extension from Holborn to Aldwych which opened 13 November 1907, and closed in 1994.

The sound of the underground could be heard on many recordings, and became known as the "Kingsway rumble". There were also recording problems created by road and construction noise, and even occasional interruptions from the clientele of the mission itself. Engineers complained that takes made with outside traffic noise could not be edited together with those made while traffic stopped for a red light.

Despite the drawbacks, Kingsway became the most sought-after recording venue for orchestral music in England because of its central location and excellent acoustics, particularly in the 1950s and 1960s, when companies were converting from monaural to stereophonic recordings. The London Symphony Orchestra alone made 421 recordings there between 1926 and 1983; the London Philharmonic Orchestra made 280 recordings there, including its very first sessions (with Malcolm Sargent conducting choral favourites).

The hall had sufficient space for choral and even operatic recordings, and the availability of the organ offered still another benefit. Since the stage itself was not large enough for an orchestra or chorus, the metal ground floor seating was removed for recordings. The conductor often faced the horseshoe balcony, giving that individual an unusual prospect of looking at the orchestra rising rapidly away from him due to the five percent raked floor that sloped down towards him and the stage behind. Cellists much preferred to have the seating this way around so that they played "downhill" rather than up.

His Master's Voice began recording at Kingsway Hall on 3 November 1925 using electrical equipment obtained from the American Western Electric company, to whom they paid a royalty on each disc sold for the patents involved, and continued making regular use of it even after the construction of its own recording complex at Abbey Road Studios in 1931.

From about 1933, EMI used its own equipment designed by their engineer Alan Blumlein, who successfully circumvented the Western Electric patents and thus avoided their substantial royalty costs. At this time, he also developed and patented a stereo disc recording method which was eventually adopted for the LP standard set in 1958.

Decca Records only began using the hall in May 1944, introducing their famous FFRR recording system developed during war work, but it would become one of the three most-used Decca recording locations (the others being Victoria Hall in Geneva, and the Sofiensaal in Vienna). The Anthony Collins Sibelius cycle was recorded there between 1952 and 1955. Lyrita used Kingsway from 1965 to 1980 (these recordings were actually produced by Decca's recording team), as did RCA Records from 1957 to 1977.

Although primarily used for classical music recording, very occasionally dance bands and the like were recorded there, including Sydney Lipton in the thirties, and Ted Heath in the summer of 1958 and again in 1963. Mantovani made a number of recordings at Kingsway, including a carol concert album in 1953, and a Kismet album for Decca's Phase Four label released in 1964. EMI rarely used the venue for chamber music, but Decca recorded solo keyboard, violin sonatas and string quartets.

EMI and Decca had opportunities to purchase Kingsway Hall, which they did not pursue. EMI determined that although the facility was one of the best recording locations in the world, refurbishment would be too expensive. Decca's and EMI's recording contracts at Kingsway expired 31 December 1983. The final recording, with the Philharmonia Orchestra conducted by Giuseppe Sinopoli, was made with Deutsche Grammophon a few days later: Giacomo Puccini's Manon Lescaut, which finished taping on 5 January 1984.

== Kingsway Hall, 1912–2012: A Centenary Tribute ==
At 3.30 in the afternoon of Friday, 6 December 1912, the Lord Mayor of London, Colonel Sir David Burnett, presided over the opening ceremony of a new Methodist Church Hall. Although this was an event that took place in central London, the opening was reported in the national press, including the Manchester Guardian, The Times, Daily Express, The Morning Post and Daily News and Leader. The Daily Graphic of 5 December, as well as several provincial newspapers, published photographs of the new Hall. That Church Hall was Kingsway Hall, well known to record collectors worldwide for the qualities of its acoustic, and it was built to replace a previous Kingsway Hall based in a chapel round the corner at 67 Great Queen Street. A chapel had existed at the site since at least 1709.

However, regular recording did not begin in the Hall until January 1926, a year of economic depression and the General Strike, when His Master's Voice signed an exclusive contract with the church authorities. That one-year agreement, the first of many, allowed for 130 sessions for a fee of £1,000. At this time, His Master's Voice also had exclusive recording access to the Queen's and Royal Albert Halls. The reason for this initiative was the coming to maturity of electrical recording technology that allowed recordings to be made in the natural acoustics of the concert hall, free of the constraints of acoustic recording and its intrusive sound gathering horns.

At first, the new technology allowed the disc recording machines to be located in other buildings in London (Queen's Hall and other His Master's Voice premises), the microphones being connected to them using Post Office telephone lines. Soon, however, disc-cutting machines were installed in the Hall itself using rooms beneath the stage. In the years between 1912 and 1926, including those of the Great War, the Hall was also used for concerts conducted by the likes of Beecham and Boult, with the young John Barbirolli among the cellists, its fine acoustic having been discovered early in its life. The Hall's active life spanned the age of the acoustic cylinder to the coming of the Compact Disc. It remained a venue for public meetings and exhibitions, for example, a model railway engineering exhibition in 1928.

The Hall itself was only part of the complex of buildings that the church had built to re-house its evangelical West London Mission, which was launched in October 1887; its partner was Wesley Hall, where the philanthropic work of the Mission was carried out. Whilst the element of the Mission that was Kingsway Hall was demolished in the late 1990s to make way for the present Kingsway Hall Hotel in Great Queen Street, Wesley Hall still stands but is now used mainly for office accommodation with an entrance in a side street.

The main entrance to Kingsway Hall in Kingsway itself is now a sandwich bar. The centenary of the WLM was celebrated at the Methodist Hinde Street premises in 1997, and the artifacts and documents of the exhibition are held at the London Metropolitan Archive. Some items are also held in the Local Studies section of the Holborn branch of the Camden library in the Theobalds Road.

During the 1930s the Great Western Railway built a series of steam locomotives in its Hall class. Number 5933 was built in June 1933 and was called Kingsway Hall. Its first home was Bristol, before being moved to Reading, Southall and finally Oxford, from where it was withdrawn from service in 1965 and scrapped at Llanelli.

Whilst the opening of Abbey Road studios in November 1931 reduced the need for Kingsway as a regular venue, His Master's Voice, now a part of the newly formed EMI, retained it under exclusive contract but available to all other EMI partner labels, including Columbia. EMI were to retain this guarded access to a prized acoustic until the Hall was acquired by the Greater London Council in 1983, after which all recording activity ceased, the final contract expiring on 31 December that year. Exclusivity was maintained throughout the whole time between 1926 and 1983 and shared between EMI, and all its affiliated labels, and Decca, and its affiliates, who joined the agreement in 1944.

Whilst both EMI and Decca used the Hall for sessions sponsored by other labels such as Lyrita, the recording teams were always those of EMI or Decca. However, occasionally, when they were not using the Hall themselves, Decca and EMI agreed to allow access to small labels using their own equipment and technicians, even loaning microphones on occasion. Such was the rare case with Bartok Records, established by Peter Bartok, the composer's son, who made a number of recordings of his father's works in 1950 (or 1951, the dates are not verified) and again in 1953. The New Symphony Orchestra was used, a pick up band organised by Jack Simmons, and for some items it was conducted by Walter Susskind. These rare recordings are available on CD.

The last recordings made at Kingsway were by Deutsche Grammophon, a partner of Philips and Decca in Phonogram since 1979, of Manon Lescaut, Sinopoli conducting the Philharmonia, recorded between 28 December 1983 and 5 January 1984. Of all the orchestras to have recorded at Kingsway, the Philharmonia/New Philharmonia spent more days there than any other. Decca's last recording was Beethoven's String Quartet Opus 130 and Große Fuge, Op. 133, with the Fitzwilliam Quartet on 10–12 December 1983. EMI's last recording appears to have been Tennstedt's Mahler 6 with the LPO in May 1983.

Whilst the vast majority of recordings at Kingsway were of London or British orchestras (e.g. the Halle under John Barbirolli, City of Birmingham under Fremaux), very rare visitors to Kingsway for recording included the Vienna Philharmonic. The VPO appeared once only, on 4 October 1949, for a recording of Mahler's Kindertotenlieder with Bruno Walter and Kathleen Ferrier for Columbia. This recording was made after a performance in London and after some contractual wrangling between Decca (who owned Ferrier's contract) on the one hand and EMI/His Master's Voice (who owned that of the VPO) and EMI/Columbia (who owned Walter's) on the other. It is available on Naxos Historical 8.110 876 as well as REGIS RRC1153 and EMI 678 722 2.

In the aftermath of World War II, Decca needed artists and so invited a number of continental orchestras to record in London, usually while they were on tour. Among these were the Turin Symphony Orchestra under Frede and Rossi, the Paris Conservatoire under Charles Munch (both in 1947) and the Hamburg Radio Symphony Orchestra under Hans Schmidt-Isserstedt. Later, the Israel Philharmonic under Mehta also recorded whilst passing through London on tour in both 1968 (Dvorak and Tchaikovsky) and 1975 (Bartok). James Galway recorded with the Zagreb Soloists for RCA in 1975. Infrequent visiting conductors were Krauss, Celibidache, Kleiber Snr, Furtwangler, Knapperstsbusch, Weingartner, Szell, Dorati, Leinsdorf and Bohm.

Although Kingsway Hall is no more, its legacy of many great recordings made over 57 years covers every genre of classical music from organ music, string quartets, solo piano, opera and choral works and film scores to full-scale orchestral symphonies. These recordings can be explored by browsing the several discographies compiled by Philip Stuart for a number of London Orchestras (LPO, LSO, ASMF and ECO) and by Stephen Pettit for the Philharmonia (up to only 1987). It even included Christmas carol recordings by the oddly named Butlin Choral Society. It was also very rarely a location for recorded jazz concerts (Ted Heath 1958 and 1963) and even Mantovani. Its acoustic added something unique to all these genres.

Its demise was brought about by a combination of events but also by factors which related to its location and the fate of the recording industry. Rumbles from the Piccadilly line plagued its whole life, as did extraneous noise from traffic and aircraft, neighbouring buildings and from the inhabitants of the Wesley Hall Mission next door.

There were always complaints about the maintenance of the building, especially when it was owned by the church, whose funds were much diminished after World War II. Indeed, the roof collapsed in early September 1969 and put the Hall out of action whilst repairs were made, and imminent sessions for the ASMF Vivaldi Four Seasons were hastily moved to St John's, Smith Square. The Church sold the whole Mission building to British Land in 1972, but this did not improve matters. After a number of attempts at justifying acquiring it, neither Decca nor EMI could envisage the building being a major recording centre, and so in 1983 it fell into the hands of the GLC, bringing its recording career to an end.

In March 1986, the GLC was abolished and the Hall put up for sale once again. In October 1987, a centenary exhibition was held at the Mission's then home at Hinde Street, near Wigmore Hall, and a history published, authored by Professor Philip Bagwell. Many of the exhibits and artifacts are now kept at the London Metropolitan Archives in London. By this time Kingsway Hall had been out of regular use for some time and was in a poor state of repair. It would seem that there were no takers, and so it was gutted and remained derelict until 1996, when planning permission for its demolition and replacement by a hotel was requested.

Gramophone magazine and the Chamber Orchestra of Europe were among the very few to object, and archeological excavations were conducted by the Museum of London, following which no widespread opposition was raised to the granting of the demolition order, English Heritage being unable to justify preservation. Kingsway Hall was demolished in 1998, and the hotel opened in 2000.

Fate seemed to dog the Mission's home; its previous two meeting Halls, St James' in Piccadilly, and Exeter Hall in the Strand, had also been demolished to make way for hotels. One Hall that was used by the WLM whilst Kingsway Hall was being built was the "new" St James, or Philharmonic, Hall in Great Portland Street. The building survives today, but now as a BBC office block called Brock House.

== Events at Kingsway Hall ==
- August 1913 – Emmeline Pankhurst delivers speech at Women's Social and Political Union meeting condemning doctors' force feeding of women caught under the Cat and Mouse Act
- 16 October 1920 – The first of the British Symphony Orchestra's "super-concerts" promoted by Thomas Quinlan: Tchaikovsky Symphony No. 5 and Bach Brandenburg Concerto No. 3 conducted by Adrian Boult. Possibly the first time orchestral music had been heard in the hall
- In February and March 1926 several recordings of the Hall's organ were made by a number of the leading organists of the day. Some of these recordings have been transferred from 78 to CD by Amphion Records of Malton in Yorkshire.
- 15 September 1926 – First recordings with Albert Coates' "The Symphony Orchestra" (this orchestra composed of London Symphony Orchestra players billed differently for contractual purposes). Beethoven's Eroica symphony was among the works recorded with the 9th symphony recorded the following month. These recordings have been transferred and refurbished and are available on CD or for download.
- 26 February 1927 – Ampico Concert featuring Grieg Concerto roll by Marguerite Volavy (soloist) accompanied by Gatty Sellers at the organ (orchestra)
- 28 October 1928 – Debate titled "Do We Agree?" over distributism between George Bernard Shaw and G. K. Chesterton chaired by Hilaire Belloc and broadcast live by the BBC (audience exceeds hall's capacity)
- During March, April and May 1929, Albert Coates and the LSO recorded Bach's B minor Mass with Elisabeth Schumann among the soloists. This recording has been transferred from 78 to CD by the Pearl label, among others.
- On 22 October 1929, Arthur Rubinstein recorded the Brahms Second piano concerto with the 29-year old John Barbirolli conducting the LSO. The recording is available on CD from Naxos Historical.
- In early January 1931, Rubinstein and Barbirolli and the LSO recorded the Chopin 2nd piano concerto and Mozart's No 23. Both recordings have been issued on CD.
- 4 June 1931 – Duke and Duchess of York (later King George VI and the Queen Mother), and Princess Elizabeth (the future Queen Elizabeth) attend recording session for Edward Elgar's Nursery Suite, with the composer conducting the London Symphony Orchestra (also recorded at Kingsway on 23 May 1931).
- 19 September 1932 – first London Philharmonic Orchestra sessions with Sir Malcolm Sargent conducting the Royal Choral Society. Sir Thomas Beecham recorded much with the LPO for His Master's Voice and Columbia labels during the 1930s but it was not until 13 December 1938 that he recorded with the orchestra at Kingsway Hall with Sessions for Mozart's 36th symphony. Schubert's 5th symphony followed two days later.
- 26 April 1933 – Virgil Fox's European debut before an audience of 1,100
- December 1933 – Anthony Eden speech on the League of Nations
- 18 June 1940 – General De Gaulle gives a speech to the Free French in London to encourage Resistance to German Occupation
- 10 August 1945 – first Philharmonia Orchestra sessions
- 27 October 1945 – Beecham conducts the first concert of the Philharmonia Orchestra (an all Mozart programme)
- 20 January 1947 – first concert of the London Symphonic Players, Harry Blech conducting
- 27 May 1947 – first Royal Philharmonic Orchestra sessions
- 28 November 1949 – Winston Churchill delivers speech championing the European Movement
- 16 April 1951 – first London performance of the Hindemith Horn Concerto with Dennis Brain and the Philharmonia Orchestra conducted by Norman Del Mar.
- 23 May 1951 – Leopold Stokowski's first British recording, of Rimsky-Korsakov's Scheherazade, with the Philharmonia Orchestra for His Master's Voice
- 22 September 1951 – first UK concert by African American blues singer and guitarist Big Bill Broonzy
- 1–2 December 1954 – Decca first experimental stereo recording in the hall of Winifred Atwell playing Grieg's Piano Concerto with the London Philharmonic and Stanford Robinson. Their first commercially released stereo recording was made on 14–15 December 1955 with Clifford Curzon on piano, the London Philharmonic Orchestra and Sir Adrian Boult playing Franck's Symphonic Variations and Holst's Scherzo from his unfinished symphony H192.
- 7 February 1955 – EMI's first stereo recordings made; Prokofiev's Symphony No. 7, Philharmonia Orchestra conducted by Nicolai Malko).
- 1956 – EMI records Falstaff
- 21 & 23 March 1961 – EMI records the legendary performance of Brahms German Requiem with the Philharmonia Orchestra conducted by Otto Klemperer, with Elisabeth Schwarzkopf and Dietrich Fischer-Dieskau as soloists
- 19 January 1969 (sic) – a large section of the main roof collapses and steel girders fall on the seats (fortunately after Sunday services). This date is that given in Bagwell's history of the WLM published in 1987 for the centenary. Unfortunately, Bagwell's information must be incorrect and other evidence at EMI archives and in the Academy of St Martins in the Fields discography points to early September 1969 for the roof fall. In addition, the LSO had sessions in the hall on 20 and 22 January.
- 24 June 1980 – Celebration for the life of record producer John Culshaw with Nigel Black, Clifford Curzon, Kenneth Sillito, Neil Black, Alan Civil, Georg Solti, Humphrey Burton, Lorin Maazel, Huw Wheldon, and Leontyne Price.

== Bibliography ==
- Gordon, Charles, 1903, T Fisher Unwin, "Old time Aldwych, the Kingsway and Neighbourhood"
- Bagwell, P S, 1987, "Outcast London – The Christian Response", Epworth, London, ISBN 0-7162-0435-5
- Chesterton, G. K. (1989) Collected Works vol. 11. San Francisco, Ignatius Press.
- Dixon, George. "The Albert Hall Organ", The Musical Times, 1 September 1924, p. 835 on the Kingsway organ additions.
- Drury, Gordon. "A Musical Mission". Classic Record Collector, Spring 2004, pp. 46–53.
- Drury, Gordon. "Heyday of Kingsway". Classic Record Collector, Summer 2004, pp. 36–42.
- Drury, Gordon. "Kingsway Diminuendo". Classic Record Collector, Autumn 2004, pp. 42–47.
- Gray, Michael. (1979) Beecham A Centenary Discography. New York, Holmes & Meier.
- Pettitt, Stephen J. (1987) Philharmonia Orchestra Complete Discography. London, John Hunt.
- Stuart, Philip (1997) The London Philharmonic Discography. Westport, Conn., Greenwood.
- Stuart, Philip (2006) The LSO Discography
- West London Methodist Mission v Holborn Borough Council. Court of Appeals of England (1958) 3 RRC 86
- Peace Pledge Union, Donald Soper
- Photographs of Kingsway Hall
