= Mark Guy Pearse =

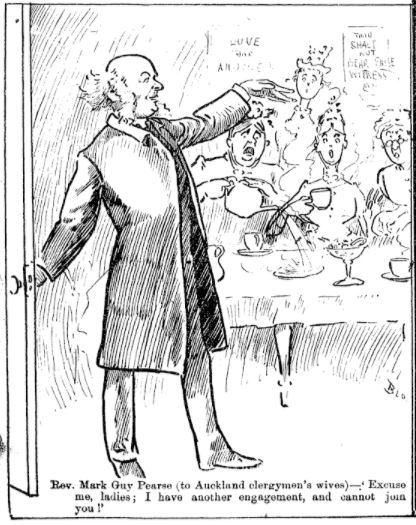
Pearse cartoon published in 1891 in New Zealand

Mark Guy Pearse (3 January 1842 – 1 January 1930) was a Cornish Methodist preacher, lecturer and author who, during the last quarter of the 19th century and the first of the 20th, was a household name throughout Britain and beyond. Born at Camborne, Cornwall, from childhood he "drank in the traditions of Methodism", as his daughter put it.

== Ministerial career ==
Pearse was born in Camborne, Cornwall on 3 January 1842.

After a false start in medicine, he studied theology, and in 1863 entered the Wesleyan ministry. His first post on leaving Didsbury College was in Leeds and over the next twenty or so years, he was appointed by the Methodist Conference to ministries in Brixton Hill, Ipswich, Bedford, Highbury, Westminster, Launceston, and Bristol.

It was during a two-year ministry at Ipswich that he began to think of writing and from 1870 until his death, he published upwards of forty books and at least an equal number of booklets, tracts and articles, most of which had a worldwide circulation.

The best-selling Daniel Quorm and his Religious Notions was read by all levels of society. His decision in 1886 not to retire to his beloved Cornwall, but to accept the invitation of Hugh Price Hughes to join him in the West London Mission resulted in extensive tours abroad to publicise its aims and achievements, and to raise money. These tours brought him into contact with Cornish communities in North America, Australasia and South Africa. For example, his visit to Invercargill, New Zealand in 1891 was well received in the Wesleyan Methodist Church there. As he toured the country talking about the Forward Movement, he received a free pass on any railroad in New Zealand; and, the reporter who attended one of his lectures described it:

To hear him speak of "parlour," "kitchen," "at homes," "clubs," "excursions," "lantern entertainments," "sisterhoods" and like subjects is a treat to be enjoyed but too seldom here. ... his primary object is to set forth the new Christianity – which is the oldest of the old – that Christ came to save men in body, soul, and spirit now; that, as he put it, we must "wash down prayer with a basin of soup."

After retiring from the Mission in 1903, he continued to preach, lecture and write, spending more and more time in Cornwall towards the end of his days. Four months before his death in London on New Year's Day, 1930, he was made a bard of Gorseth Kernow (the Cornish Gorsedd), at Carn Brea, taking the name Pyscajor a Dus (Fisher of Men).

Pearse married Mary Jane Cooper and they had four daughters (one of them the artist Frances Mabelle Unwin, 1869–1956) and two sons.

The Cornish Guardian, 22nd November 1906

‘Gorran Wesleyan Band of Hope held its first entertainment on Thursday evening. The Rev. Mark Guy Pearce’s story, “The man who spoiled the music”, was read by Mr. G. Martyn, and illustrated with lantern pictures, also “The six piccaninnies”, which greatly amused the younger folk. The lantern was manipulated by Messrs. H. Michell and F. Pearce. Mr. E. Searle (president) occupied the chair.’

== Devotional writings and tales ==
His writings include devotional works and semi-religious tales, especially of Cornish life. Some of the best known are:

- Mister Horn and his friends; or, Givers and Giving
- Daniel Quorm and his Religious Notions (1874–75), of which several hundred thousand copies were printed in many languages
- Some Aspects of the Blessed Life (1887)
- Homely Talks (1888)
- Elijah, the Man of God (1891)
- The Gentleness of Jesus (1898)
- The Story of a Roman Soldier (1899)
- Christ's Cure for Care (1902)
- West Country Songs (1902)
- Bridgetstow (1907)
- The Prophet's Raven (1908)
- A Village Down West (1924)
- The Ship where Christ was Captain (1926)

== Influence ==
Emmeline Pethick-Lawrence, the women's rights campaigner, was to describe him as "the strongest influence upon the first half of my life".
