= West London Methodist Mission =

Coordinates: 51°31′2″N 0°9′4″W

The West London Methodist Mission was established in 1887 under the leadership of Hugh Price Hughes, a leading voice in British Methodism and in Nonconformity, and has a long track record as a Methodist ministry and as a spiritual home for "good works". Its early days are very much associated with its founder, Price Hughes, a strong supporter of Britain's temperance movement. The mission has been instrumental in teaching Methodism, and providing a spiritual and physical base from which such notable Methodists as Lord Soper worked. At its founding it was associated with suffragettes and suffragists, and gave them encouragement and active assistance.

According to Charity Choice, a directory of UK charities, under the charity title "West London Mission":

"For over 100 years the West London Mission of the Methodist Church has been in the forefront of care for some of the London's neediest people. The work now concentrates on the homeless, those with drug and alcohol problems, offenders against the law and counselling. The Mission runs Day Centres and specialist high care residential units. This work relies on voluntary contributions and more information is always available."

Hugh Price Hughes' colleague, Mark Guy Pearse, engaged with the artistic and literary scene in the West End. Involved in the Forward Movement and in the raising of funds for the Central Hall, Westminster, the mission's base was finally to be Kingsway Hall in Holborn. Here the West London Mission entered a second defining phase of its life with the Superintendency of Donald Soper (later Lord Soper), under whose control it suffered catastrophic decline.

Upon Lord Soper's retirement the Mission moved its base to its current home at Hinde Street Methodist Church in Marylebone, from where it runs a number of specialist social care ministries. These are in the fields of homelessness and drug and alcohol recovery. It also has a chaplaincy to the University of Westminster. There are two churches in the West London Mission: Hinde Street and King's Cross. The latter has a significant Chinese-speaking ministry.

== Objectives ==
=== Historical objectives ===
Hughes wanted to tackle the poverty in the West End of London and to challenge the rich: both expressions of the Christian Gospel he preached. From its outset, the mission has combined Christian commitment, community, outreach, and social care.

=== Current objectives ===
The West London Mission has several mission statements attributable to it. A distillation of these is that it works with the socially and economically disadvantaged in West London, concentrating currently on people who are homeless, young, misusing alcohol or drugs and/or in trouble with the law.

== History ==
The Mission was the birthplace of many initiatives, including:

- Establishment of The Sisters of the People by Katherine Hughes, wife of Hugh Price Hughes, a forerunner of the Wesley Deaconess Order
- Crèches for working girls
- One of Britain's first hospices for the dying
- West London Mission Housing Association
- Daycare centres
- Specialist high care residential units
- Helping the homeless
- Helping those with drug or alcohol problems

The history of the mission was written by Philip Bagwell (D 2006) in his book Outcast London.

== Superintendents ==
- Hugh Price Hughes (1847–1902), from 1887 to 1902.
- Rev Dr Donald Soper (1903–1998), later Lord Soper, from 1936 to 1978.

== See also ==
- Emmeline Pethick-Lawrence
- Kingsway Hall
