= Joanna Trollope =

English writer (1943–2025)

Joanna Trollope CBE
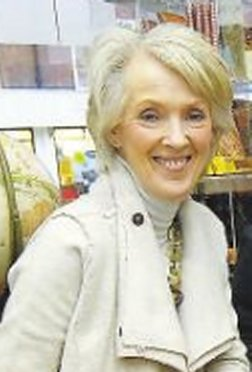
- Trollope in 2011
- Born: 9 December 1943; Minchinhampton, Gloucestershire, England
- Died: 11 December 2025 (aged 82); Oxfordshire, England
- Occupation: Novelist
- Spouses: David Roger William Potter (m. 1966; div. 1983) Ian Curteis (m. 1985; div. 2001)
- Children: 4
- Relatives: Anthony Trollope
- Writing career
- Pen name: Caroline Harvey
- Language: English
- Period: 1978–2025

Joanna Trollope (/ˈtrɒləp/ TROL-əp; 9 December 1943 – 11 December 2025) was an English writer. She also wrote under the pseudonym of Caroline Harvey. Her novel Parson Harding's Daughter won the 1980 Romantic Novel of the Year Award by the Romantic Novelists' Association.

== Early life, family and education ==
Joanna Trollope was born on 9 December 1943 at her grandfather's rectory in Minchinhampton, Gloucestershire, England, the daughter of Rosemary Hodson and Arthur George Cecil Trollope. Her father was head of a small building society and an Oxford University classics graduate. Her mother was an artist and writer. Her father was away for Second World War service in India when she was born; he returned when she was three years old. The family settled in Reigate, Surrey. Trollope had a younger brother and sister. She was educated at Reigate County School for Girls, gaining a scholarship to St Hugh's College, Oxford, in 1961. She read English.

Victorian novelist Anthony Trollope was her fifth-generation uncle, and she was a cousin of the writer and broadcaster James Trollope. Of inheriting the name, she remarked:

Oddly my name has been no professional help at all! It seems to have made no difference ... I admire him hugely, both for his benevolence and his enormous psychological perception.

== Career ==
From 1965 to 1967, she worked at the Foreign and Commonwealth Office. While a civil servant, she researched Eastern Europe and the relations between China and the developing world. From 1967 to 1979, she was employed in a number of teaching posts before she became a writer full-time in 1980.

Trollope began writing historical romances under the pseudonym of Caroline Harvey, the first names of her father's parents. She formed the view that: "It was the wrong genre for the time." Encouraged by her second husband, Ian Curteis, she switched to the contemporary fiction for which she became known. The Choir, published in 1987, was her first contemporary novel. The Rector's Wife, published in 1991, displaced Jeffrey Archer from the top of the hardback bestseller lists. As an explanation, she said in 2006: "except for thrillers there was nothing in the middle ground of the traditional novel, which is where I think I am." In 1992, only Jilly Cooper's Polo and Archer's As the Crow Flies were stronger paperback bestsellers. "I think my books are just the dear old traditional novel making a quiet comeback", she told Geraldine Bedell in a 1993 interview for The Independent on Sunday.

Often described as Aga sagas, for their rural themes, only two of Trollope's novels (by 2006) actually feature an Aga. The term's entry in The Oxford Companion to English Literature (2009) states that "by no means all her work fits the generally comforting implications of the label". Rejecting the label as not being accurate, Trollope told Lisa Allardice, writing for The Guardian in 2006: "Actually, the novels are quite subversive, quite bleak. It's all rather patronising isn't it?" Allardice disputed the "cosy reputation" Trollope's books had acquired as her novels had "tackled increasingly thorny issues including lesbianism, broken families and adoption, the mood growing darker with each novel." Terence Blacker, who coined the term for Trollope's fiction in Publishing News in 1992, admitted a decade later that he "felt terribly guilty" for lumbering Trollope with the phrase. Trollope told Bedell in 1993 that her fiction does "the things the traditional novel has always done" by mirroring reality and exploring "people's emotional lives". Bedell observed that her novels until then were:

never suburban, which is the real condition of most of England. Trollopian action takes place in large village houses, at vast kitchen tables; her doctors, vicars, solicitors and craft-gallery owners may worry about money, as her own parents did, but they don't have any social anxieties: they are invited for drinks at the big house as a matter of course. The books are as economically prestigious, and quite as aspirational in their own way, as the glitter blockbusters of the Eighties.

In 2009, she donated the short story The Piano Man to Oxfam's 'Ox-Tales' project, four collections of UK stories written by 38 authors. Trollope's story was published in the 'Water' collection. She wrote the first novel in HarperCollins updating of the Jane Austen canon, The Austen Project. Her version of Sense and Sensibility was published in October 2013 with limited success.

An adaptation of The Rector's Wife (1994), produced for Channel 4, starred Lindsay Duncan and Ronald Pickup. The Choir, adapted by Ian Curteis, was a five-episode BBC television miniseries in 1995. It starred Jane Asher and James Fox. Of her other novels, A Village Affair and Other People's Children were also adapted for television.

== Reviews ==
A Spanish Lover: In The New York Times Betsy Groban wrote, ″Her story is filled with lively, astute and always affectionate insights into the abiding issues of marriage, motherhood and materialism, not to mention the destructive power of envy and the importance of living one's own life. ″

Marrying the Mistress: ″With its sharp eye, light tone and sly, witty pace, Joanna Trollope's ninth novel delivers all the ingredients of romantic comedy, yet ends with a subtle, dark twist.″

Friday Nights: Heather Thompson of The Guardian called Friday Nights "a light but insightful look at a rather conventional cast of characters."

Charlie Lee-Potter, in an article for The Independent, wrote that Brother & Sister:

wades through the anguish of adoption, scooping up the pain of the adopted child, the agony of the birth mother and the insecurity of the adoptive parent along the way. If I was any one of the characters imprisoned in the murky jelly of this novel, I'd be straight on to the Adoption Agency, demanding to be re-settled with another creator. Joanna Trollope has a subject capable of making us weep at the tragedy and the loss, and yet what does she achieve? She so resolutely makes her characters emote to each other in a ghastly brand of unisex mush that I actually found myself blushing.

== Personal life and death ==
On 14 May 1966, Trollope married a city banker, David Roger William Potter. The couple had two daughters, Louise and Antonia, but divorced in 1983. In 1985, Trollope married the television dramatist Ian Curteis and became stepmother to his two sons; she and Curteis divorced in 2001. After her second divorce, Trollope moved to West London. She was a grandmother and owned a Labrador Retriever.

Trollope appeared on a 1994 edition of the radio programme Desert Island Discs. She remarked that men often suggested her books were trivial, to which she liked to respond: "It is a grave mistake to think there is more significance in great things than in little things", paraphrasing Virginia Woolf.

Trollope died at her home in Oxfordshire on 11 December 2025 aged 82.

== Works ==
=== As Joanna Trollope ===
Some of Joanna Trollope's historical novels are re-edited as Caroline Harvey**

==== Historical novels ====
- Eliza Stanhope (1978)
- Parson Harding's Daughter (1979)**
- Leaves from the Valley (1980)**
- The City of Gems (1981)**
- The Steps of the Sun (1983)**
- The Taverner's Place (1986)**

==== The Austen Project ====
- Sense & Sensibility (2013)

==== Other novels ====
- The Choir (1988)
- A Village Affair (1989)
- A Passionate Man (1990)
- The Rector's Wife (1991)
- The Men and the Girls (1992)
- A Spanish Lover (1993)
- Next of Kin (1996)
- The Best of Friends (1998)
- Other People's Children (1998)
- Marrying the Mistress (2000)
- Girl from the South (2002)
- Brother and Sister (2004)
- Second Honeymoon (2006)
- Friday Nights (2007)
- The Other Family (2010)
- Daughters-in-Law (2011)
- The Soldier's Wife (2012)
- Balancing Act (2014)
- City of Friends (2017)
- An Unsuitable Match (2018)
- Mum & Dad (2020)

==== Non-fiction ====
- Britannia's Daughters: Women of the British Empire (1983)

=== As Caroline Harvey ===
==== Legacy Saga ====
- Legacy of Love (1983)
- A Second Legacy (1993)

==== Historical novels ====
- A Castle in Italy (1993)
- The Brass Dolphin (1997)

== See also ==
- Aga saga
