= Week of Self-Denial =

Week of fundraising in support of women's suffrage

- Official name: Week of Self-Denial
- Observed by: Supporters of the Women's Social and Political Union (WSPU)
- Type: National
- Observances: Fundraising
- Date: Spring
- Duration: 1 week
- Frequency: Annual, 1908-1914
- Related to: Suffragettes; Votes for Women

Between 1908 and 1914 the Women's Social and Political Union's (WSPU) held an annual Week of Self-Denial where supporters of the suffragette movement were asked to go without certain necessities for a week, donating the money saved to the WSPU.

== Background ==
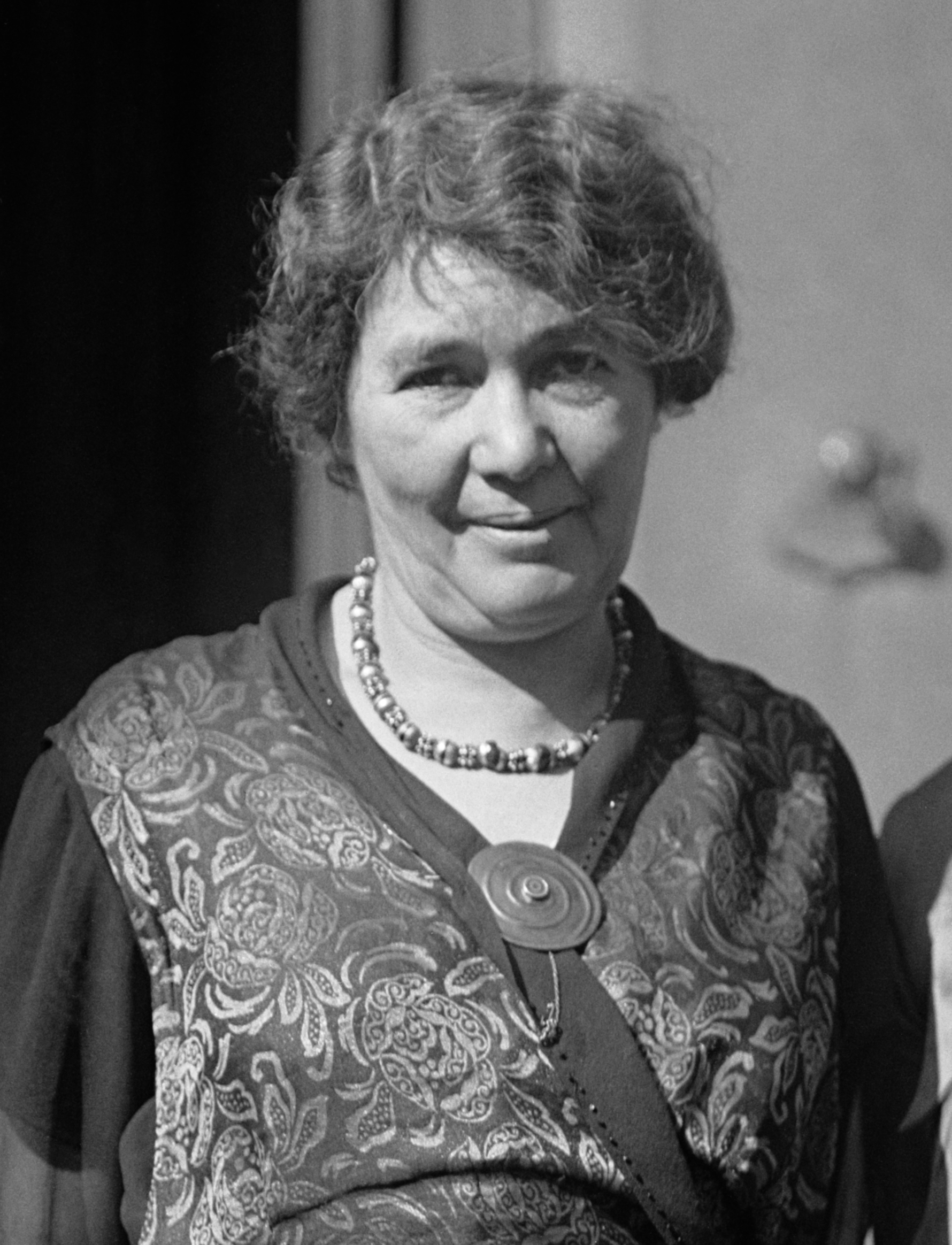
Emmeline Pethick-Lawrence

The WSPU's first Week of Self-Denial was organised by Emmeline Pethick-Lawrence and supported by Beatrice Sanders and Adelaide Knight. It followed the National Women's Social and Political Union's (WSPU) third Women's Parliament meeting in February 1908. The concept of a 'Week of Self-Denial' as a fundraiser was inspired by similar events held by the Salvation Army.

An advertisement for the event appeared in the December 1907 issue of the suffragette paper, Votes for Women. It read "The funds raised during this week will be the measure not only of every woman's devotion to principle, but the measure of her gratitude to the hundreds of brave women who have taken the brunt of the fighting and have suffered violence and imprisonment for her sake." Monies raised were called "fighting funds".

== Week of Self-Denial 1908 ==
Running from 16 to 22 February 1908, supporters were asked to go without things such as "tea, cocoa, milk or sugar, or one or two meals a day", with the money saved being donated to support the work of the WSPU. Women including Evelyn Sharp, May Sinclair, Violet Hunt and Clemence Housman, stood holding collecting boxes outside the Kensington High Street station. Public collections were also taken at the largest WSPU office on High Street, Kensington. Fundraising activities put on during the week included pavement artists, street singing organ-grinding, cross-sweeping, boot-blacking, soap-making and selling, sock-darning and enamelling. One woman, who could not risk being arrested for the cause because of her professional job, ate a prison diet for a week and donated the saved money to the fund. Money was collected outside football matches and tube stations and many women donated jewellery.

Emmeline Pankhurst, WSPU's chairperson, was unable to attend most of the week's activities as she was in prison. However, she happened to be released just in time to attend a large meeting at the Royal Albert Hall marking the close of the week on 19 March. Her imprisonment was well known; thus her attendance was not expected. Instead, a placard with her name had been placed on the chairperson's empty seat on the dais. Of her unplanned appearance she wrote, "I walked quietly onto the stage, took the placard out of the chair and sat down. A great cry went up from the women as they sprang from their seats and stretched their hands toward me."

The week's fundraising raised at least £6,800 (equivalent to £670,000 in 2024).

== Week of Self-Denial 1909-1914 ==
- The week of 27 February 1909. Bad weather dampened the activities, which included selling paper, flowers, fruit and chocolates on the street. Some supporters donated their week's wages, others walked instead of using a bus or tram and donated the money they saved, one man proposed to "go without his cigars for a week" and donate the ten shillings he would save, and a woman offered to divine "the character of any applicant by reading their handwriting on receipt of a shilling," which she donated.
- The week of 30 April 1910. Called "Special Effort and Special Self-Denial Week", there was an aim of raising £100,000, part of which was put towards "a procession on May 28, the largest and the most beautiful that has ever passed through the streets of London Town."
- The week of 20 March 1911. In February, the suffragette paper Votes for Women stated: "The week of Self-Denial this year will probably be the last before the vote is won." A sum of £100,000 was set as a target, with £90,000 raised by March.
- March 1912
- March 1913. Annie Kenney suggested that "suffragettes should:- Parade the streets with barrel organs; play violins at theatre queues; take out barrows of fruit; make pavement sketches." Members in Ipswich used an "American matchpenny" scheme in order to raise "a hundred yard of pennies." On Saturday 1 March two women collecting money by playing their piano organ were attacked by two men and "a large mob surrounded them" shouting things like, "Who fired the Kew tea-house?" and "Bomb throwers!" The two men were arrested. A "great meeting" was held at the Royal Albert Hall on 10 April.
- March 1914. The final Week of Self-Denial before WWI bought activities to a halt.

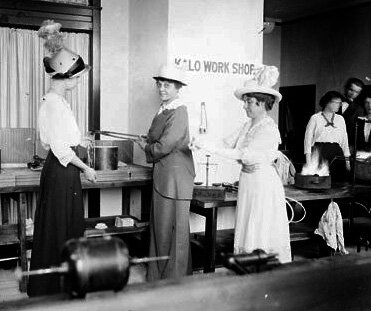
Self-Denial Day to raise money for women's suffrage, July 1914 in Chicago

== Other organisations ==
The Women's Freedom League did not take part in the Week of Self Denial. American suffragettes held similar weeks of self-denial in 1910, 1911 and 1914.

== See also ==
- Cowman, Krista (2011) Women of the right spirit: Paid organisers of the women's social and political union (WSPU) 1904-1918 Pub. Manchester University Press ISBN 9780719070037
