= Greystone House =

House in Devizes, Wiltshire, England

Coordinates: 51°21′04″N 1°59′38″W

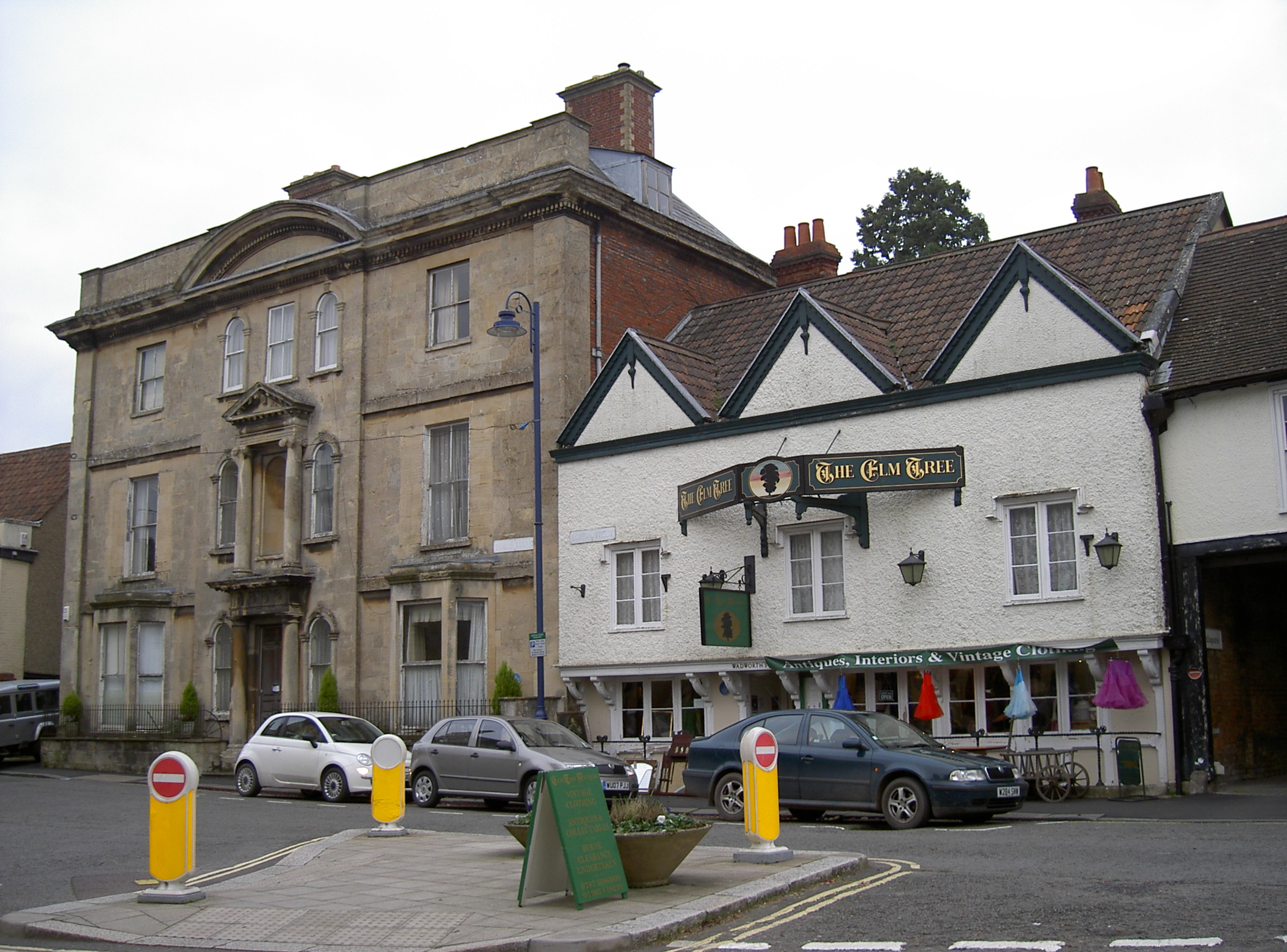
Greystone House (left)

Greystone House is a Grade II* listed house in High Street, Devizes, Wiltshire, England. It was built between 1740 and 1744 with a front of Bath stone to a brick building with a hipped slate roof.
