= A Village Affair (novel) =

1989 novel by Joanna Trollope

- Author: Joanna Trollope
- Cover artist: Bronzino, detail from Venus, Cupid, Folly and Time, c.1545
- Language: English
- Genre: Novel
- Published: 1989
- Publisher: Bloomsbury Publishing, Harper & Row
- Publication place: United Kingdom
- Media type: Print (Hardback)
- Pages: 256 pp
- ISBN: 0747503656
- OCLC: 20273811 (Harper & Row ed.)
- Dewey Decimal: 823/.914
- LC Class: PR6070.R57 V55 1989

A Village Affair is a 1989 romance novel by English author Joanna Trollope. Published by Bloomsbury, the story concerns an unhappy young wife and mother, Alice Jordan, whose friendship with a young and independent woman, Clodagh Unwin, becomes a love affair. It was published in the United States by Harper & Row.

== Film ==
A Village Affair was adapted as a television film and broadcast by ITV on 17 April 1995.
