= Terence Blacker =

English songwriter, author and columnist (born 1948)

Terence Blacker FRSL
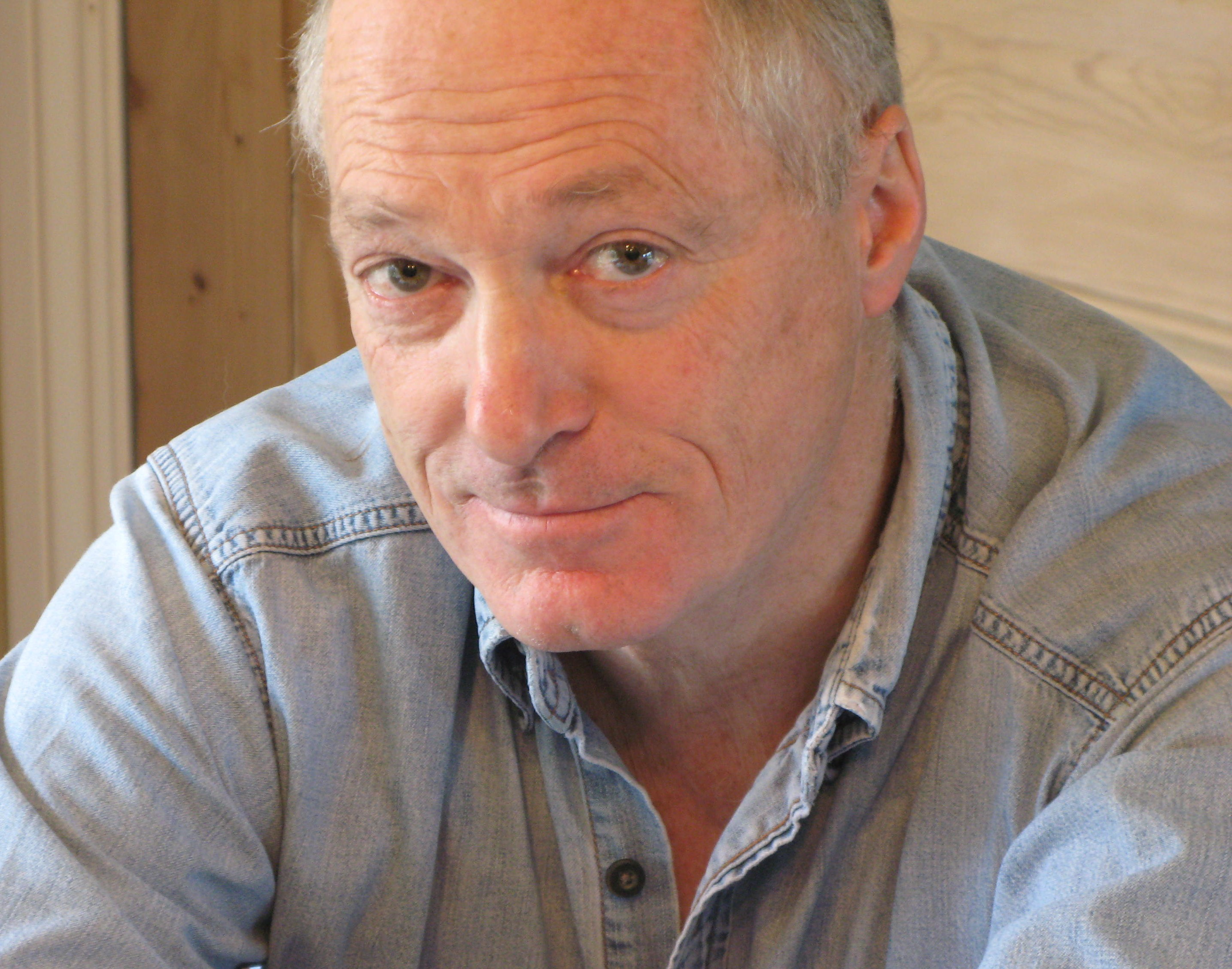
- Born: 5 February 1948 (age 78) near Hadleigh, Suffolk, England
- Education: Wellington College; Trinity College, Cambridge
- Occupations: Songwriter, author and columnist
- Spouse(s): Caroline Soper, m. 1975, div. 2001
- Parent: Cecil Blacker (father)
- Relatives: Philip Blacker (brother)

Terence Blacker FRSL (born 5 February 1948) is an English songwriter, author and columnist.

== Early life and education ==
Blacker was born near Hadleigh, Suffolk. He is the son of General Sir Cecil Blacker, and the brother of sculptor and former jockey Philip Blacker.

He grew up on the family farm in Suffolk. He attended Hawtreys preparatory school and Wellington College, before reading English at Trinity College, Cambridge, whence he graduated in 1969.

== Life and work ==
Blacker began his working life in horse-racing and as an amateur jockey. Subsequently, he worked in publishing for 10 years during the 1970s and 1980s, where he was responsible for overseeing the publication of works by Jerzy Kosinski.

Blacker became a full-time writer in 1983 and has written children's books and mysteries for adults. His first children's book, If I Could Work, was published in 1987 and his first adult novel, FIXX, won critical acclaim and was described by The Guardian as a "tour de force". He is an active member of English PEN, and is also an EAW member.

He writes the "Endpaper" for The Author. For many years, he wrote the "Harvey Porlock" column in The Sunday Times, as well as a column about the book business for Publishing News. His regular writing for The Independent, newspaper, usually consisting of twice-weekly columns, came to an end in December 2013 after nearly 16 years.

Blacker was elected a Fellow of the Royal Society of Literature in 2017.

== Personal life ==
In 1975 he married Caroline Soper, youngest daughter of the radical Methodist minister Donald Soper (div. 2001). They have two children, Xan and Alice. Blacker's partner is now Angela Sykes.

== Publications ==
- Adult books
  - Fixx (Bloomsbury, 1989), ISBN 0-7475-0270-6
  - The Fame Hotel (Bloomsbury, 1992), ISBN 0-7475-1244-2
  - Revenance (Bloomsbury, 1996), ISBN 0-7475-2436-X
  - Kill Your Darlings (Weidenfeld & Nicolson, 2000), ISBN 0-297-64658-3
  - You Cannot Live as I Have Lived and Not End Up Like This: The Thoroughly Disgraceful Life and Times of Willie Donaldson (Ebury, 2007), ISBN 978-0-09-191386-1
- Children's books
  - Girl Power by Blacker
  - Neil's Book of the Dead by Blacker, Nigel Planer (Pavilion, 1984), ISBN 0-907516-53-X
  - Henry and the Frights (Piccadilly, 1989), ISBN 0-946826-99-4
  - Houdini, the Disappearing Hamster (Andersen, 1990), ISBN 0-86264-250-7
  - Herbie Hamster, Where Are You? by Blacker, Pippa Unwin (Random House Children's Books, 1990), ISBN 0-679-80838-8
  - The Surprising Adventures of Baron Munchausen (Hodder Children's Books, 1990), ISBN 0-340-51261-X
  - If I Could Work (Lippincott Williams & Wilkins, 1991), ISBN 0-517-07121-5
  - Homebird (Piccadilly, 1991), ISBN 1-85340-116-1; (Prentice Hall & IBD, 1993 ISBN 0-02-710685-3)
  - Nasty Neighbours / Nice Neighbours (Macmillan Children's Books, 1992), ISBN 0-333-54675-X
  - The Transfer (Macmillan Children's Books, 1998), ISBN 0-333-68970-4
  - The Angel Factory (Simon & Schuster Books for Young Readers, 2002), ISBN 0-333-90072-3
  - You Have Ghost Mail (Macmillan Children's Books, 2002), ISBN 0-333-96001-7
  - Boy2girl (Macmillan Children's Books, 2004), ISBN 0-330-42121-2
  - Tinseltown (Macmillan Children's Books, January 2005), ISBN 1-4050-5707-6
  - Parentswap (Farrar Straus Giroux, August 2006), ISBN 0-374-35752-8
  - Missing, Believed Crazy (Macmillan Children's, July 2009), ISBN 0-330-45848-5
- Ms Wiz series
  - Ms Wiz Spells Trouble (Macmillan Children's Books, 1993), ISBN 0-333-60766-X; (Piccadilly, 1988), ISBN 1-85340-022-X
  - In Stitches with Ms Wiz (Macmillan Children's Books, 1993), ISBN 0-333-60767-8; (Piccadilly, 1989 ISBN 1-85340-044-0)
  - You're Nicked, Ms Wiz (Macmillan Children's Books, 1993), ISBN 0-333-60768-6; (Piccadilly, 1989 ISBN 1-85340-051-3)
  - In Control, Ms Wiz? (Macmillan Children's Books, 1993), ISBN 0-333-60769-4; (Piccadilly, 1990 ISBN 1-85340-061-0)
  - Ms Wiz Goes Live (Macmillan Children's Books, 1993), ISBN 0-333-60770-8 (Piccadilly, 1990 ISBN 1-85340-073-4)
  - Ms Wiz Banned! (Macmillan Children's Books, 1993), ISBN 0-333-60771-6; (Piccadilly, 1990 ISBN 1-85340-092-0)
  - Time Flies for Ms Wiz (Macmillan Children's Books, 1993), ISBN 0-333-60772-4; (Piccadilly, 1992 ISBN 1-85340-181-1)
  - Power-crazy Ms Wiz (Macmillan Children's Books, 1993), ISBN 0-333-60773-2; (Piccadilly, 1992 ISBN 1-85340-177-3)
  - Ms Wiz Loves Dracula (Macmillan Children's Books, 1993), ISBN 0-333-60774-0; (Piccadilly, 1993 ISBN 1-85340-250-8)
  - You're Kidding Me, Ms Wiz (Macmillan Children's Books, 1996), ISBN 0-333-67103-1
  - Ms Wiz Supermodel (Macmillan Children's Books, 1997), ISBN 0-333-71117-3
  - Ms Wiz Smells a Rat (Macmillan Children's Books, 1998), ISBN 0-333-73734-2
  - Ms Wiz and the Sister of Doom (Macmillan Children's Books, 1999), ISBN 0-333-76161-8
  - Ms Wiz Goes to Hollywood (Macmillan Children's Books, 2000), ISBN 0-333-90175-4
  - Ms Wiz: Millionaire (Macmillan Children's Books, 2001), ISBN 0-333-94794-0
  - The Secret Life of Ms Wiz (Macmillan Children's Books, 2002), ISBN 0-333-99460-4
  - The Crazy World of Ms Wiz (Macmillan Children's Books, 2004), ISBN 0-330-43136-6
  - Ms Wiz Superstar (Macmillan Children's Books, 2004), ISBN 0-330-43406-3
  - Ms Wiz Mayhem (Macmillan Children's Books, 2006), ISBN 978-0-330-44287-9
  - Totally Spaced, Ms Wiz (Macmillan Children's Books, 2008), ISBN 978-1-84270-702-9
  - Fangtastic, Ms Wiz Mayhem (Macmillan Children's Books, 2008), ISBN 978-1-84270-703-6
  - Out of Control, Ms Wiz (Macmillan Children's Books, 2009), ISBN 978-1-84270-847-7

== See also ==
- AGA saga
