= Weston-super-Mare Town Council =

Parish council in Weston-super-Mare, England

Type
- Type: Parish council

History
- Founded: 2000
- Preceded by: Avon County Council; Woodspring district

Leadership
- Mayor: Cllr Owen James, Labour since May 2023
- Deputy Mayor: Cllr Caroline Reynolds, Liberal Democrat

Structure
- Seats: 31 councillors
- Political groups: Town Council (31) Labour (14) Conservative (9) Liberal Democrat (8)
- Length of term: Whole council elected every four years

Elections
- Voting system: First-past-the-post
- Last election: 4 May 2023
- Next election: TBA

Meeting place
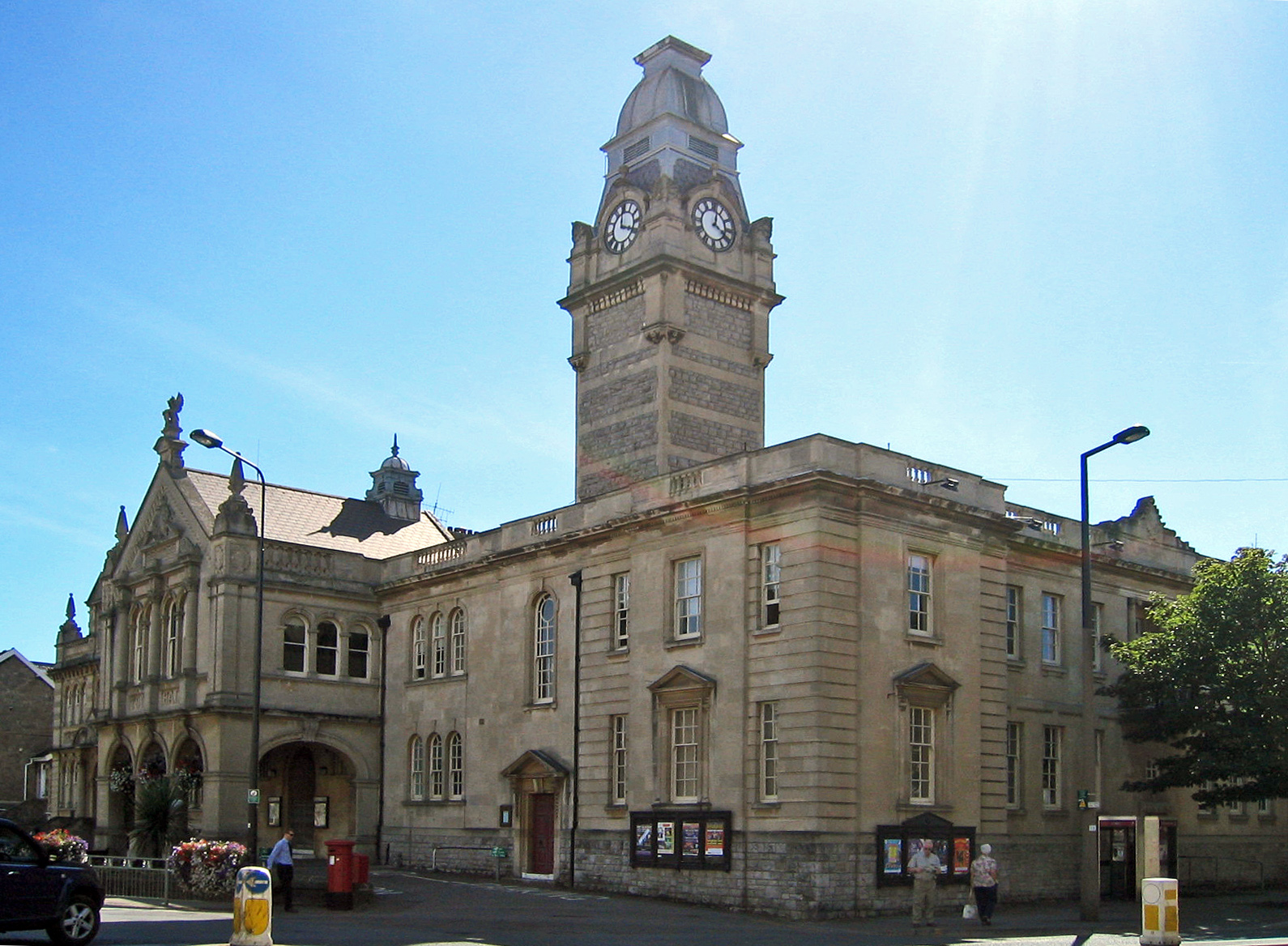
- Weston-super-Mare Town Hall

Website
- wsm-tc.gov.uk

Weston-super-Mare Town Council is a parish council serving Weston-super-Mare in the United Kingdom. The council is responsible for providing the following services: allotments, bus shelters, cemeteries, dog waste bins, noticeboards, parks, play areas and green spaces, public toilets, and youth services.

== Current councillors ==
Ward	Party	Councillor
Bournville	Labour	James Clayton
Bournville	Labour	Catherine Gibbons
Bournville	Labour	Alan Peak
Central	Liberal Democrat	Mike Bell
Central	Liberal Democrat	Robert Payne
Central	Liberal Democrat	Caroline Reynolds
Hillside	Liberal Democrat	Raymond Armstrong
Hillside	Liberal Democrat	Mark Canniford
Hillside	Liberal Democrat	John Crockford-Hawley
Mid Worle	Conservative	John Standfield
Mid Worle	Liberal Democrat	Jemma Coles
Milton	Labour	Simon Harrison-Morse
Milton	Labour	Robert Skeen
Milton	Labour	Timothy Taylor
Milton	Labour	Richard Tucker
North Worle	Conservative	Marc Alpin
North Worle	Conservative	Justyna Pecak-Michalowicz
North Worle	Conservative	Marcia Pepperall
South Worle	Labour	Hugh Malyan
South Worle	Conservative	Peter Crew
South Worle	Labour	Owen James
South Worle	Labour	John Carson
Uphill	Conservative	Roger Bailey
Uphill	Conservative	Gillian Bute
Uphill	Labour	Helen Thornton
Winterstoke	Labour	Charles Williams
Winterstoke	Labour	Ciaran Cronnelly
Winterstoke	Labour	Annabelle Chard
Worlebury	Liberal Democrat	Joe Bambridge
Worlebury	Conservative	Lisa Pilgrim
Worlebury	Conservative	Martin Williams

== Council offices ==
The Town Council moved into new offices at 32 Waterloo Street on 8 July 2024.
