= Donald Soper =

British Methodist minister, socialist and pacifist (1903–1998)

The Reverend and the Right Honourable The Lord Soper
- Portrait by Walter Bird, 1965

Member of the House of Lords
- In office May 1965 – December 1998

Councillor of the Greater London Council
- In office April 1964 – May 1965

President of the Methodist Conference
- In office June 1953 – June 1954
- Vice President: Leslie Ward Kay
- Preceded by: Colin Augustus Roberts
- Succeeded by: William Russel Shearer

Personal details
- Born: Donald Oliver Soper; 31 January 1903 Wandsworth, London, United Kingdom
- Died: 22 December 1998 (aged 95) London, United Kingdom
- Party: Labour
- Spouse: Marie Dean
- Children: 4
- Education: St Catharine's College, Cambridge; Wesley House; London School of Economics
- Occupation: Minister, councillor

Donald Oliver Soper, Baron Soper (31 January 1903 – 22 December 1998) was a British Methodist minister, socialist and pacifist. He served as President of the Methodist Conference in 1953–54. After May 1965 he was a peer in the House of Lords.

Historian Martin Wellings states:

His combination of modernist theology, high sacramentalism, and Socialist politics, expressed with insouciant wit and unapologetic élan, thrilled audiences, delighted admirers, and reduced opponents to apoplectic fury.

== Early life ==
Soper was born at 36 Knoll Road, Wandsworth, London, the first of the three children of Ernest Frankham Soper (1871–1962), an average adjuster in marine insurance, the son of a tailor, and his wife, Caroline Amelia, née Pilcher (b. 1877), a headmistress and daughter of a builder.

He was educated at Aske's School in south London, at St Catharine's College, Cambridge, where he read history, at Wesley House theological college, and at the London School of Economics, where he took his PhD. He was an exceptional sportsman who captained his school at football, cricket, and boxing, but he withdrew from cricket after he accidentally killed an opposing batsman with a fast delivery when bowling.

== Ministry ==
Soper offered as a candidate for the Methodist ministry, and while still a probationary minister (in his first appointment), he sought larger congregations by taking to open air preaching in imitation of the founders of Methodism. From 1926 until well into his nineties, he preached at London's centres for free speech, Tower Hill and (from 1942) Speakers' Corner in Hyde Park; he was often referred to as "Dr Soapbox" in honour of the outdoor preacher's chief piece of apparatus. He was controversial and quick-thinking, and drew large crowds.

On 3 August 1929, he married Marie Dean. They had four daughters, the youngest of whom, Caroline, was the first wife of the writer Terence Blacker.

Early in his ministry, Soper was radicalised by the inner-city poverty that he witnessed. He became an active member of the Labour Party and much of his preaching was concerned with the political implications of the Christian gospel; late in life, he offended many Conservatives by his fiercely expressed argument that the policies of Margaret Thatcher were inherently incompatible with Christianity. From 1936 until his retirement in 1978, he was the minister of Kingsway Hall, a "Central hall" within the Methodist Church and the home of the West London Methodist Mission which exercised a ministry of practical care for marginalised groups such as the homeless, unmarried mothers and alcoholics. In 1952 he was elected as the President of the Methodist Conference, the governing body of the Methodist Church, serving in 1953–54.

Soper was a vegetarian. As well as being a socialist, he was a teetotaler, a vigorous opponent of blood sports (he was President of the League Against Cruel Sports from 1967 to 1997) and gambling (he criticised the British Royal Family's association with horse racing), and most notably, a pacifist. He joined the Peace Pledge Union in 1937 and preached pacifism throughout the Second World War, being deemed so effective that he was banned from broadcasting on the BBC. After the War, Soper often appeared on radio and television shows, including becoming a regular presenter on BBC's Thought for the Day. He was critical of Ian Paisley and the Free Presbyterians in Northern Ireland.

== Activities ==
He was active in the Campaign for Nuclear Disarmament from its beginnings, and was president of the Fellowship of Reconciliation in England for many years until his death. For twenty years he wrote regularly for the socialist magazine Tribune, and in 1958 was elected as an alderman (Labour) of the London County Council. After the abolition of the LCC, he became an alderman on the Greater London Council (1964–65) and accepted the offer of a life peerage from the Labour government of the day, and so was created on 12 May 1965 Baron Soper, of Kingsway in the London Borough of Camden. He became the first Methodist minister to sit in the House of Lords, an institution whose existence he opposed (he referred to it as "proof of the reality of life after death") but which he was able to use as a platform for the expression of his views.

In 1967, Soper lamented that "To-day we are living in what is the first genuinely pagan age—that is to say, there are so many people, particularly children, who never remember having heard hymns at their mother's knee, as I have, whose first tunes are from Radio One, and not from any hymn book; whose first acquaintance with their friends and relations and other people is not in the Sunday School or in the Church at all, as mine was".

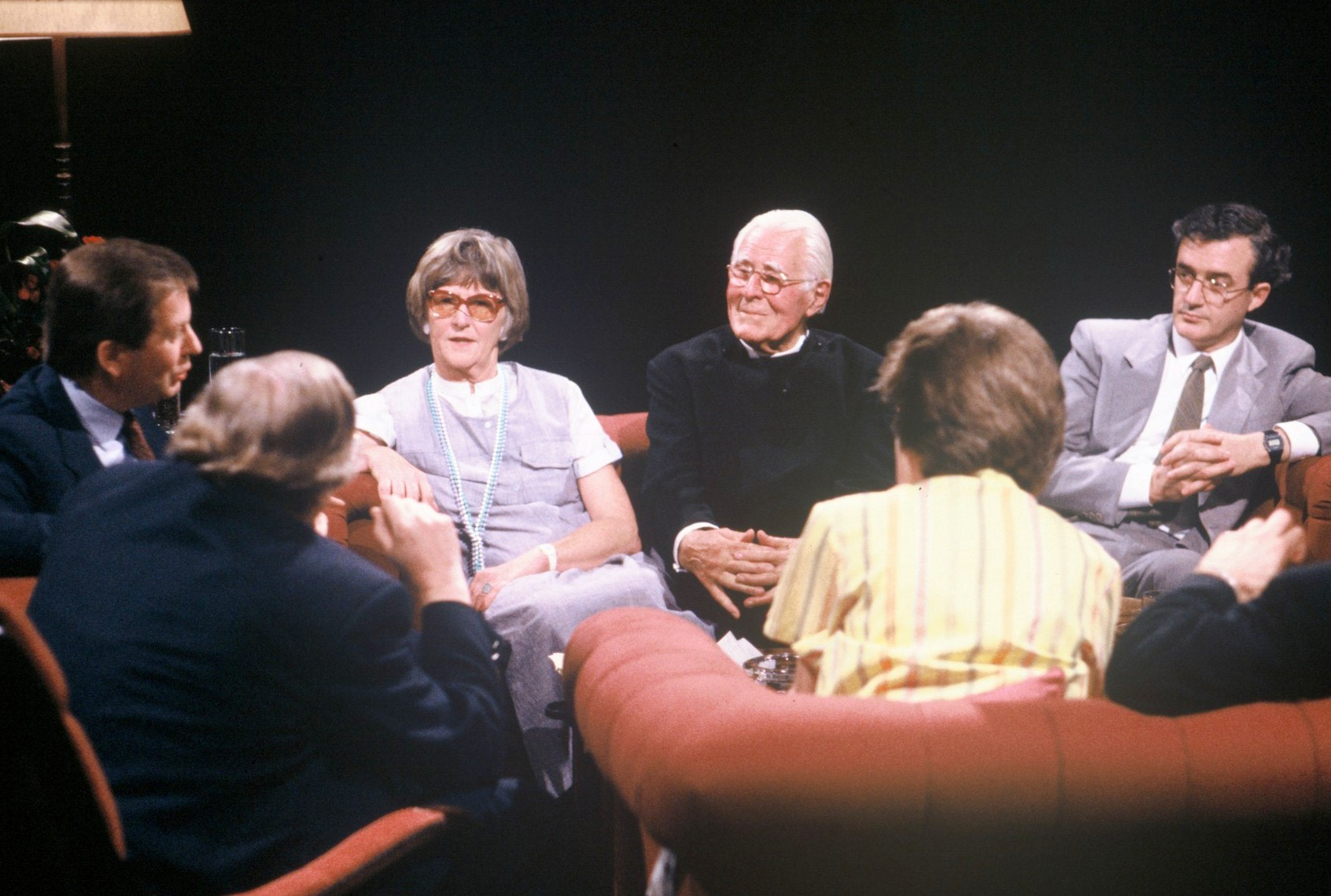
Appearing (centre) with Charlotte Hough, John Finnis and others on After Dark in 1987: "Killing With Care?"

== Retirement ==
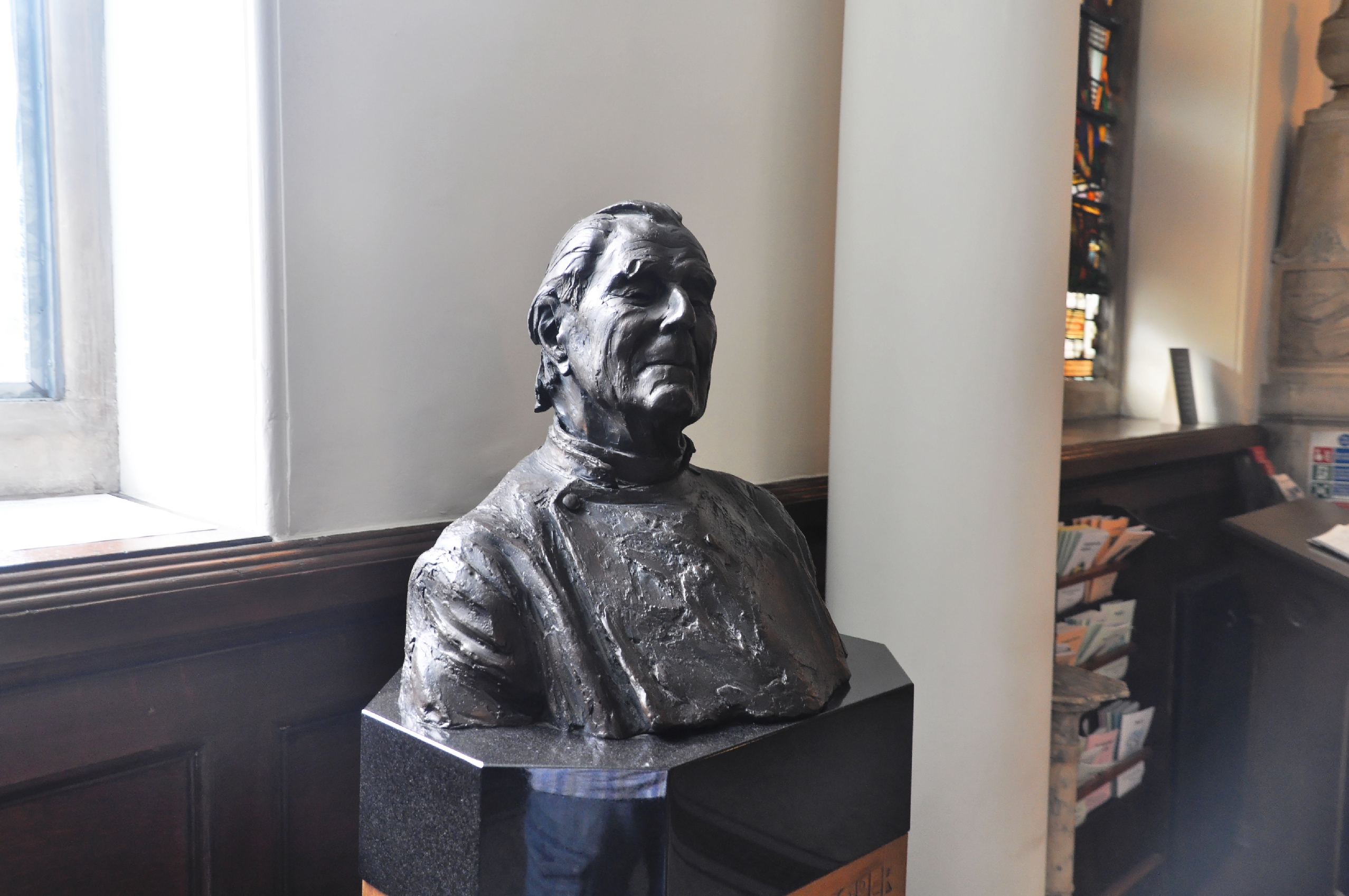
Bust of Soper in Wesley's Chapel, London

After he left circuit ministry he became a supernumerary (retired) minister based at Hinde Street Methodist Church in Marylebone. In 1978 he spoke in depth about his time as a controversial figure on a soapbox at Hyde Park Corner and his hopes for the future in the BBC radio programme Quest into 1978 with priest and journalist Owen Spencer-Thomas.

In his last years, Soper was disabled by severe arthritis and had to use a wheelchair, but he did not allow this to stop him preaching and making public appearances. He died on 22 December 1998, aged 95.

From 2005, his old school, now called Haberdashers' Hatcham College, has a house dedicated to him – the only one to not be named after a headmaster or headmistress.

== See also ==
- List of peace activists
