= Basque Country (autonomous community) =

Autonomous community of Spain

Basque Country Euskadi (Basque)^{[a]} País Vasco (Spanish)
- Autonomous community
- Basque Autonomous Community; Euskal Autonomia Erkidegoa (Basque)^{[b]} Comunidad Autónoma Vasca (Spanish)
- Flag Coat of arms
- Anthem: Eusko Abendaren Ereserkia (Basque) "Anthem of the Basque Ethnicity"
- Location of the Basque Country community in Spain
- Interactive map of the Basque Country community
- Coordinates: 42°50′N 2°41′W
- Country: Spain
- Statute(s) of Autonomy: 1979 (Statute of Gernika)
- Capital: Vitoria-Gasteiz
- Largest city: Bilbao
- Provinces: Álava, Biscay, Gipuzkoa

Government
  - Type: Devolved government in a constitutional monarchy
  - Body: Basque Government
  - Lehendakari: Imanol Pradales (EAJ/PNV)
  - Legislature: Basque Parliament

Area
  - Total: 7,234.27 km^{2} (2,793.17 sq mi)
  - Rank: 14th in Spain
- 1.4% of Spain

Population (2025)
  - Total: 2,242,343
  - Rank: 8th in Spain
  - Density: 309.961/km^{2} (802.796/sq mi)
- 4.6% of Spain
- Demonyms: Basque • euskaldun or euskal herritar (Ba.) • vasco, -a (Sp.)
- Official language(s): Basque; Spanish

GDP
  - Total: €91.613 billion (2024)
  - Per capita: €40,862 (2024)

HDI
  - HDI (2023): 0.948^{[c]} (very high · 2nd in Spain)
- Time zone: UTC+1 (CET)
  - Summer (DST): UTC+2 (CEST)
- Postal code prefixes: 01XXX (VI); 48XXX (BI); 20XXX (SS)
- Telephone code: +34 94-
- ISO 3166 code: ES-PV
- Currency: Euro (€) (EUR)
- Official holiday: October 25th
- Website: euskadi.eus
- a. Also Euskal Herria, according to the Basque Statute of Autonomy. b. Also Euskal Herriko Autonomia Erkidegoa, according to the Basque Statute of Autonomy. c. Eustat, the statistics agency of the Basque Government calculates the HDI of the region as if it were an independent country using the methodology of the United Nations Development Programme (UNDP)

The Basque Country or Basque Autonomous Community, (Note: Pronunciation of the term "Basque" in English: /bæsk/ or /bɑːsk/) (Note: Basque: Euskal Autonomia Erkidegoa (EAE) [eus̺kal autonomia eɾkiðeɣoa] Spanish: Comunidad Autónoma Vasca (CAV) [komuniˈðað awˈtonoma ˈβaska]) also officially called Euskadi, (Note: Pronunciation of "Euskadi": [eus̺kaði]) is an autonomous community in northern Spain. It includes the Basque provinces of Álava (Araba), Biscay (Bizkaia), and Gipuzkoa (Guipúzcoa). It surrounds two enclaves, Treviño and Valle de Villaverde. With a population of 2,242,343, it is the 8th most populous autonomous community of Spain.

The Basque Country was granted the status of nationality, attributed by the Spanish Constitution of 1978. The autonomous community is based on the Statute of Autonomy of the Basque Country, a foundational legal document providing the framework for the development of the Basque people in the Southern Basque Country. Parallel to this, Navarre, which narrowly rejected a joint statute of autonomy in 1932, was granted a separate chartered statute in 1982.

Currently there is no official capital in the autonomous community, but the city of Vitoria-Gasteiz, in the province of Álava, is the de facto capital as the location of the Basque Parliament, the headquarters of the Basque Government, and the residence of the President of the Basque Autonomous Community (the Palace of Ajuria Enea). The High Court of Justice of the Basque Country has its headquarters in the city of Bilbao. Whilst Vitoria-Gasteiz is the largest municipality in area, with 276.96 square kilometres (106.93 sq mi), Bilbao is the largest in population, with a population of 350,975, located in the province of Biscay within a conurbation of 875,552 people.

The term Basque Country may also refer to the larger cultural region (Basque: Euskal Herria), the home of the Basque people, which includes the autonomous community.

== History ==
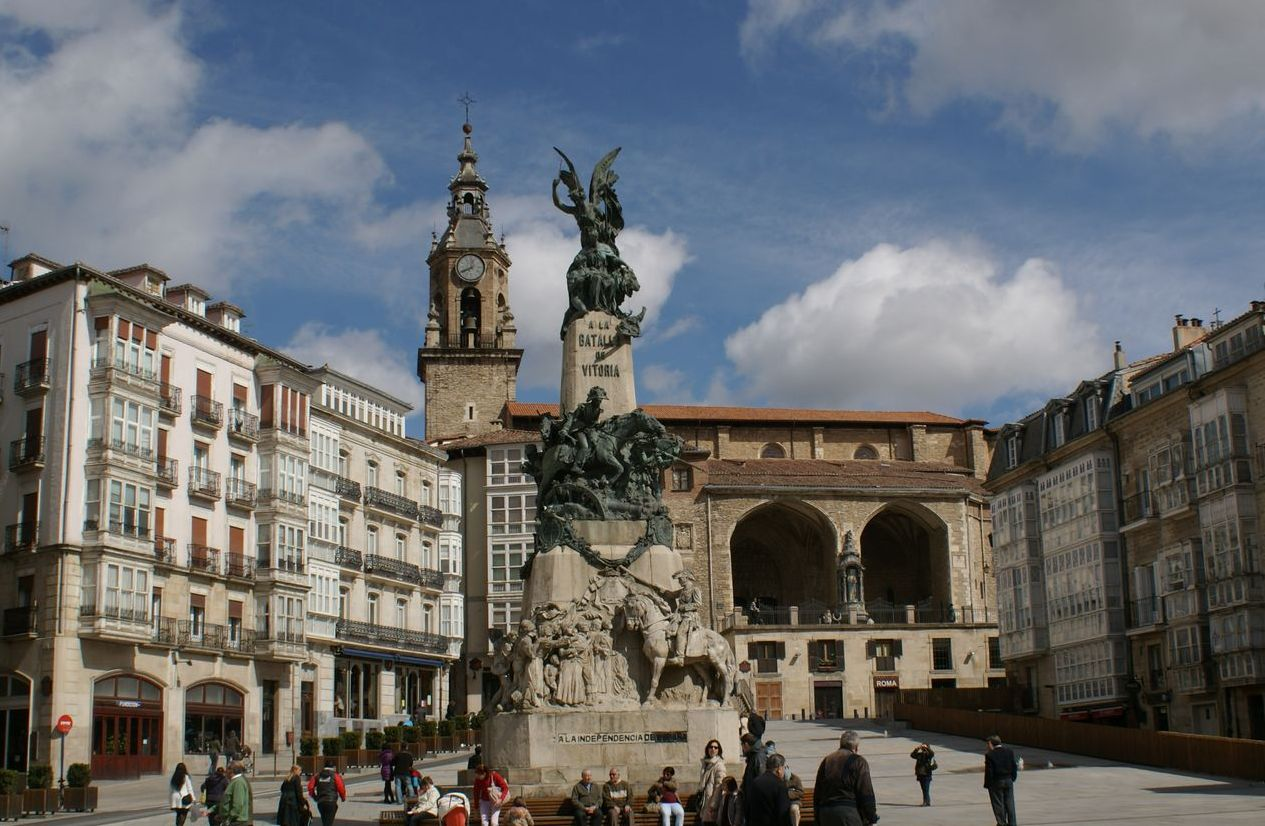
Monument to the Battle of Vitoria, part of Spanish Independence War against the French rule.

The forerunner of the Gernika Statute was the short-lived Statute of Autonomy for Álava, Gipuzkoa and Biscay, which came to be enforced in October 1936 just in Biscay, with the Spanish Civil War already raging, and which was automatically abolished when the Spanish Nationalist troops occupied the territory.

Before the Spanish Constitution of 1978 and its system of autonomous communities, these three provinces were known in Spanish as the Provincias Vascongadas since 1833. The political structure of the new autonomous community is defined in the Gernika Statute, which was approved by a majority in a referendum held on 25 October 1979. Nowadays it is one of the most decentralised regions in the world; in this regard it has been described as having "more autonomy than just about any other in Europe" by The Economist.

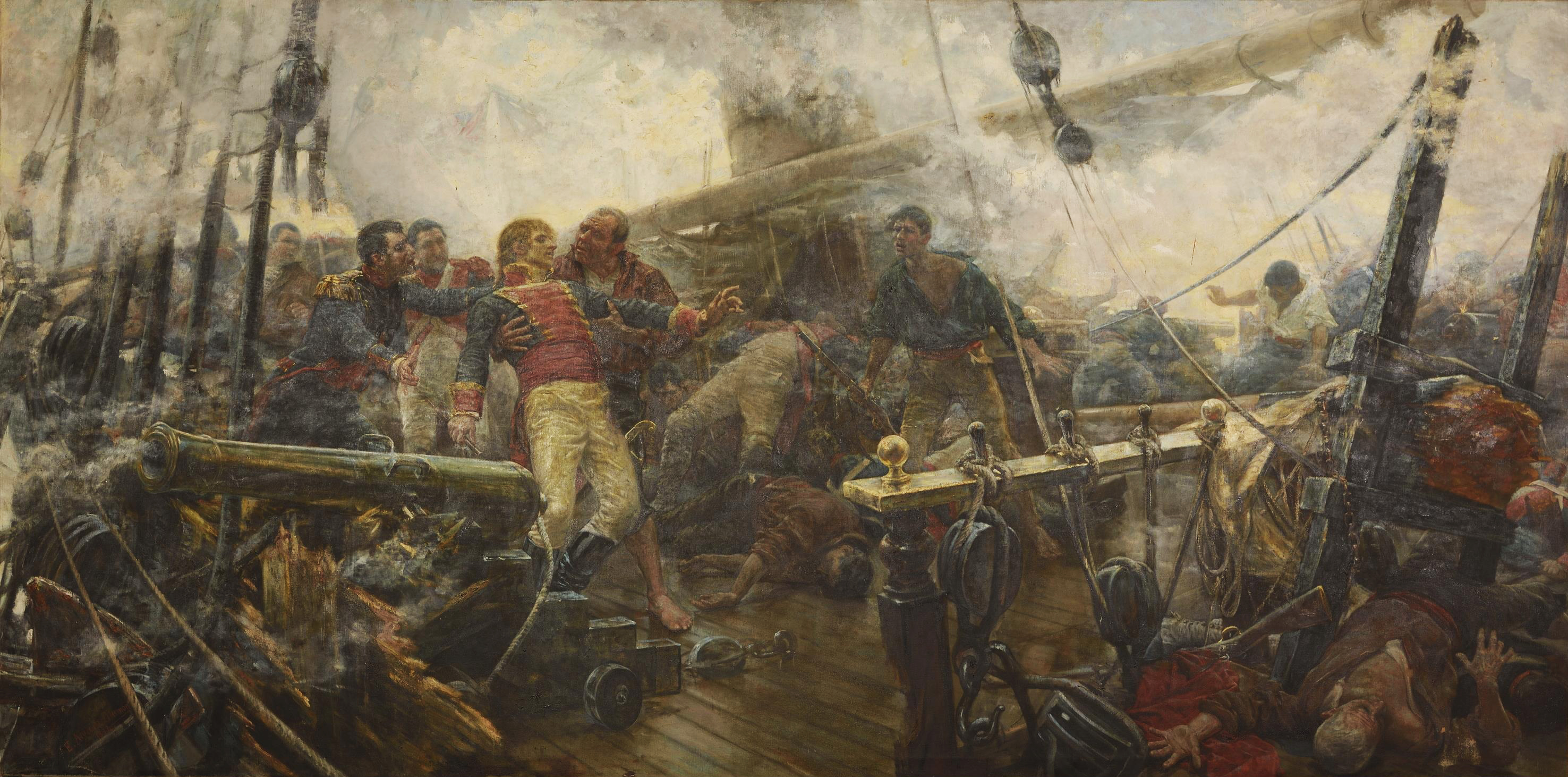
Churruca's death at the Battle of Trafalgar. Basque navigators were key for the navy of Castile and later the Spanish Navy.

As regards the bounds to the Spanish Constitution, Basque nationalists cite the fact that in the 1978 Spanish Constitution referendum, which was passed with a majority of votes and a poor turnout in this area, the Basque Country had the highest abstention (the Basque Nationalist Party had endorsed abstention on the grounds that the Constitution was being forced upon them without any Basque input). To this, the "NO" vote in this referendum was also higher in the Basque Country than in the rest of the state. All in all, many Basques believe that they are not bound to a constitution that they never endorsed.

The Statute of Autonomy of the Basque Country is an organic law but powers have been devolved gradually during decades according to re-negotiations between the Spanish and the consecutive Basque regional governments to reach an effective implementation, while the transfer of many powers are still due and has always been a matter of heated political discussion. Basque nationalists often put down this limitation in the devolution of powers to concessions made to appease the military involved in the 23-F coup d'état attempt (1981).

In 2003, the governing Basque Nationalist Party (PNV) proposed to alter this statute through the Ibarretxe Plan. The Ibarretxe bill was approved by absolute majority in the Basque Parliament after much discussion, as it was subject to lengthy legal objections—on the grounds that it contradicts the Spanish Constitution—that were ultimately overcome. Despite its mandate of the majority of the autonomous Parliament, the main two parties in Spain (PSOE, PP) imposed a blockade on a discussion of the Plan in the Spanish Parliament (Madrid Cortes Generales), resulting in its rejection for debate by a large majority of that Parliament in January 2005.

Since the first autonomic cabinet, the Basque Nationalist Party has held office in the Basque Autonomous Community except for a 2009–2012 term, led by Patxi López (PSE-PSOE). The current Basque prime minister is Iñigo Urkullu, also a member of the Basque Nationalist Party. Despite ETA's ceasefire in 2011, this autonomous community shows the highest rate of police per 100 inhabitants in Western Europe by 2018. As agreed with the Spanish premier Zapatero in 2004, Urkullu intends to increase the figure of ertzainas, while the Spanish PP's Ministry of Interior rejects a pullback of Spanish police bodies, as demanded by the large majority of the political forces in the autonomous parliament, even pointing to an increase of the Guardia Civil in the future.

== Geography ==
The following provinces make up the autonomous community:

- Álava (Basque Araba), capital Vitoria-Gasteiz
- Biscay (Spanish Vizcaya, Basque Bizkaia), capital Bilbao
- Gipuzkoa (Spanish Guipúzcoa), capital San Sebastián

=== Plaiaundi Ecology Park ===
The Plaiaundi Ecology Park is a 24-hectare coastal wetland lying where the Bidasoa River meets the sea in the Bay of Biscay. The nature of Plaiaundi consists of a wide variety of flora (visitors view them mainly in the spring) and fauna (visitors with binoculars arrive all during the year, because of the birds migratory habits).

== Politics ==
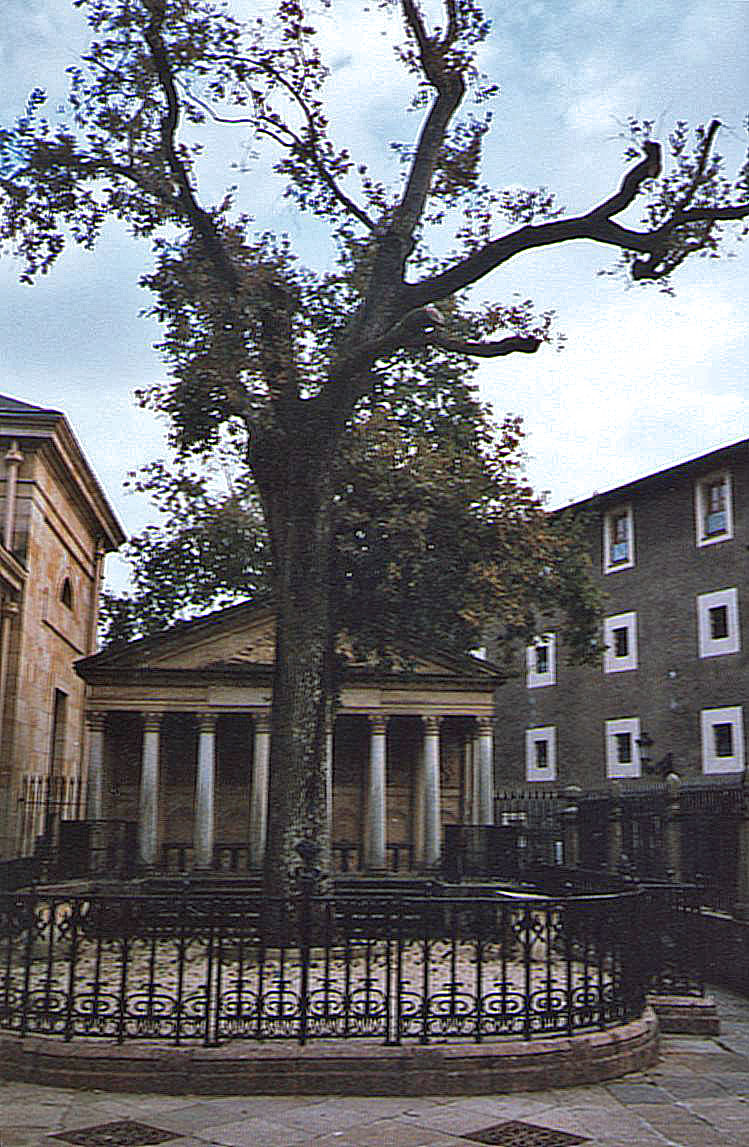
The historic Oak of Gernika, symbol of the Basque institutions.

=== Governmental institutions ===
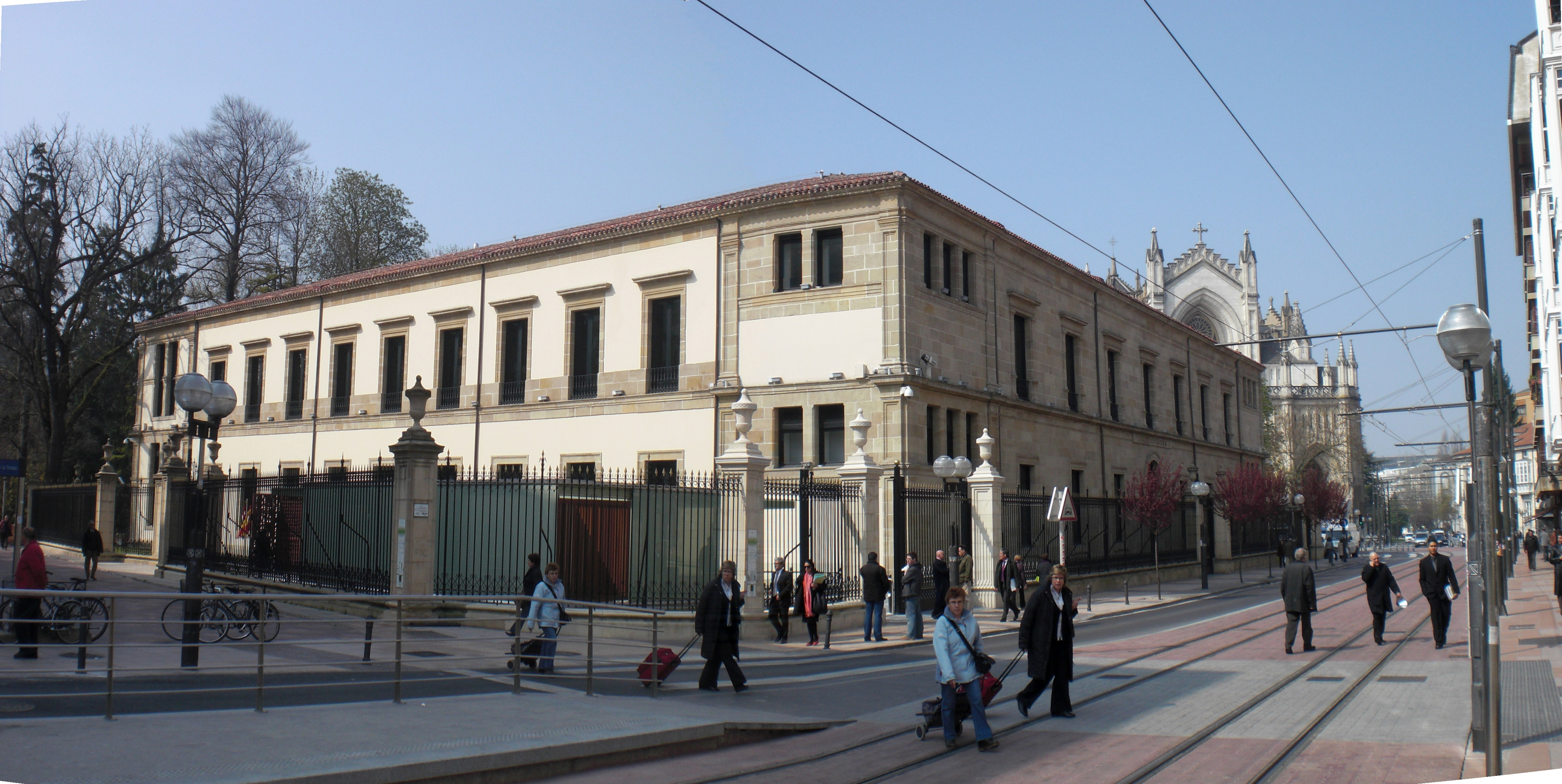
Basque parliament building in Vitoria-Gasteiz

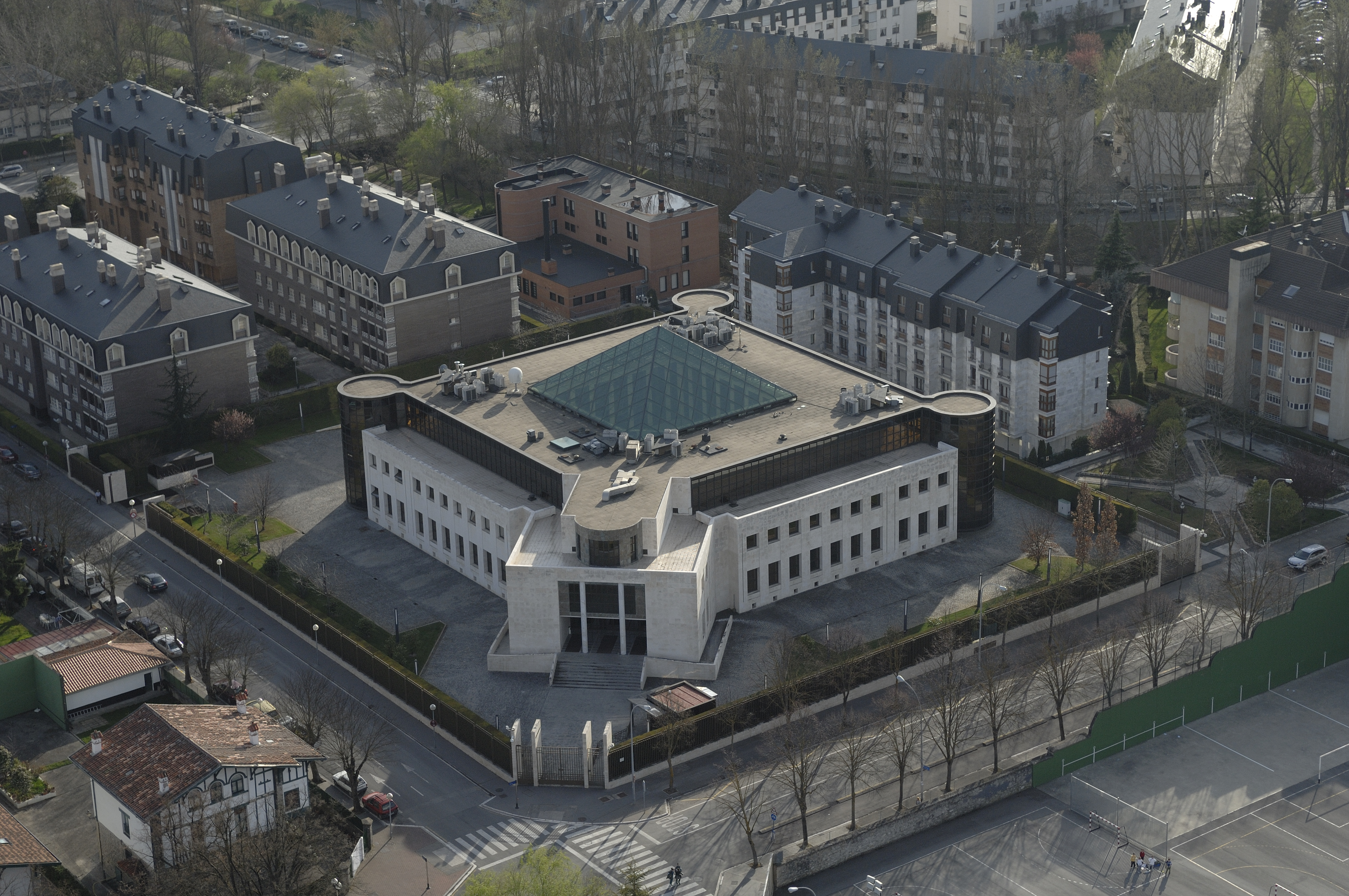
Lehendakaritza, president's office in Vitoria-Gasteiz.

The current laws configure the autonomous community as a federation of its present-day three constituent provinces. These western Basque districts kept governing themselves by their own laws and institutions even after the Castilian invasion in 1199–1200. The new king upheld their institutional system issued from the consuetudinary law prevalent in Basque and Pyrenean territories. This limited self-government, similar to the one for Navarre, was partially suppressed in 1839 and totally in 1876 in exchange for an agreement on tax-collection and a number of administrative prerogatives. These in turn were suspended by Franco for Gipuzkoa and Biscay, but restored by the Spanish Constitution of 1978.

The post-Franco Spanish Constitution of 1978 acknowledges historical rights and attempts a compromise in the old conflict between centralism and the different national identities (Basque, Catalan and Galician). A negotiation between UCD's Suárez in office and PNV led to the establishment of the Basque statute, with its first article stating that the Basque people (Euskal Herria) takes on an institutional personality in the form of the Basque Autonomous Community; the 2nd article goes on to establish that it may be constituted by Álava, Biscay, Gipuzkoa, as well as Navarre. Provincial councils provided with actual relevant attributions (taxation, etc.) were restored to these provinces (called therefore diputación foral), but Navarre detached from the Basque political process. A specific approach to the national realities in Spain was eventually diffused by a legal provision allowing for the establishment of autonomous administrations and parliaments to any region in Spain (e.g. Castile and León, Catalonia, the Valencian Community, etc.), while the Basques, Catalans, and Galicians were acknowledged historic specificity.

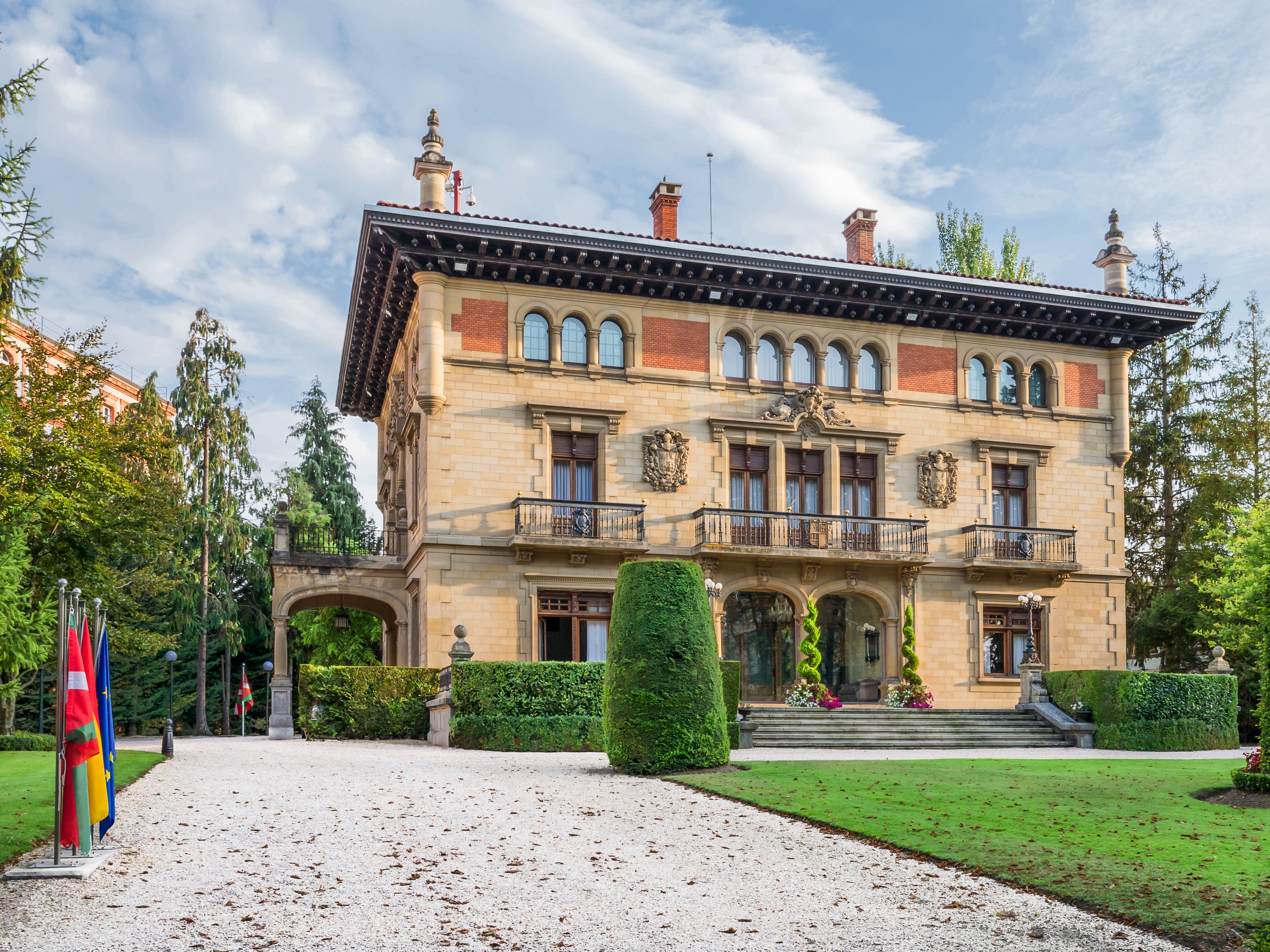
Ajuria Enea Palace, official residence of the Lehendakari in Vitoria-Gasteiz

The provinces in the Basque Country still perform tax collection in their respective territories, but with limited margin in decision making under the Spanish and European governments. Under this intricate system, the Diputaciones Forales (Basque: Foru Aldundiak) administer most of each of the provinces but are coordinated by the autonomous Basque Government (Spanish Gobierno Vasco, Basque: Eusko Jaurlaritza). The autonomous community has its own police force (the Ertzaintza), controls Education and Health Systems, and has a Basque radio/TV station. These and only some of the powers acknowledge in the Gernika Statute have since 1980 been transferred to the Autonomous Community by the Cortes Generales under the Gernika Statute. The seats of the Basque Parliament and Government are in Vitoria-Gasteiz, so it is the capital city de facto, but the Basque Autonomous Community has no capital de jure.

The Parliament is composed of 25 representatives from each of the three provinces. The Basque Parliament elects the Lehendakari (President of the Autonomous Community of the Basque Country) who forms a government following regular parliamentary procedures. Until 2020, except for the 2009–2012 period, all Lehendakaris (even those in 1937 and during the exile) have been members of the Basque Nationalist Party (Euzko Alderdi Jeltzalea) (moderate and Christian-Democrat) since 1978. Since 1982 until the late 1990s, Basque nationalists ideologically closer to ETA refused to turn out in the Basque parliament, a significant wedge of the parliament. Currently, the Basque Government is headed by Iñigo Urkullu (PNV).

Summary from 2024 Basque Parliament election results PNV (27) EH Bildu (27) PSE (12) PP (7) Sumar (1) Vox (1)

=== Present-day political dynamics ===
ETA's permanent ceasefire (2010–2011) opened the possibility of new governmental alliances and has enabled EH Bildu's electoral success and rise to governmental institutions (Gipuzkoa, and capital city San Sebastián, 2011–2015). In the 2012 Basque parliamentary election, the PNV obtained a plurality of the votes, followed by the left-wing nationalist coalition EH Bildu (Eusko Alkartasuna, Sortu, Alternatiba).

In 2016 the Basque regional election was held on 25 September to elect the 11th Parliament of the Basque Autonomous Community, which left a hung parliament, with the combination of Basque nationalist parties (PNV and EH Bildu) representing the largest wedge in the parliament of the Basque Autonomous Community, the main Spanish parties PP and PSOE's branches occupying a 24% of the seats, and Podemos – Ahal Dugu accounting for 11 seats (14.66% of the total). However, the leading party PNV renewed its traditional alliance with the PSE to form government.

During the 2017 Catalan referendum crisis, the parliament showed its sympathy and support to the Catalan independence referendum and lashed out at the Spanish government's stance on the issue, denouncing any measures it may take against the vote or 'democracy' altogether. Besides supporting the vote, Basques of this community showed a preference for further self-government (43.5%), with independence and present-day status quo ranking as second and third options (22.6% and 18.9%). In 2016, the parliament of the autonomous community passed a Police Abuses Act spanning the period between 1978 and 1999; it was shortly repealed after challenged by the public prosecutor and appealed also by virtually all police and Civil Guard unions. Incoming Spanish premier Pedro Sanchez agreed to lift the public prosecutor's block on the law in exchange for altering its content. Right-wing parties in Spain, Vox, PP, and Ciudadanos, sent one MP out of 18 to the Spanish Congress from this autonomous community in the 2019 November general election in contrast with their rise and important presence in the overall Spanish results.

=== Territorial issues ===
The statute, insofar as it is addressed and provides an administrative framework for the Basque people, provides the mechanisms for neighbouring Navarre to join the three western provinces if it wishes to do so, since at least part of it is ethnically Basque. The Basque Government used the "Laurak Bat", which included the arms of Navarre, as its symbol for many years. The Navarrese Government protested, and tribunals ruled in their favour. The Basque Government replaced it with an empty red field.

Navarre is one of the historical Basque territories and even claimed by the Basque nationalists as the core of the Basque nation. There are also two enclaves surrounded by Basque territory—Treviño (Basque: Trebiñu) and Valle de Villaverde (Basque: Villaverde-Turtzioz)—which belong to the fellow neighbouring communities of Castile and León and Cantabria respectively, for which a legal connection to the Basque Country has become an on-off matter of political discussion.

== Demographics ==
Historical population
Year	Pop.	±%
1842	281,645	—
1857	413,470	+46.8%
1877	461,765	+11.7%
1887	510,194	+10.5%
1900	602,204	+18.0%
1910	672,884	+11.7%
1920	783,125	+16.4%
1930	884,601	+13.0%
1940	948,096	+7.2%
1950	1,039,465	+9.6%
1960	1,358,657	+30.7%
1970	1,867,287	+37.4%
1981	2,141,809	+14.7%
1991	2,104,041	−1.8%
2001	2,082,587	−1.0%
2011	2,185,393	+4.9%
2021	2,212,628	+1.2%
Source: INE

As of 2025, the population is 2,242,343, of which 48.7% are males, and 51.3% are females. Minors make up 15.2% of the population, and seniors make up 24.2%.

Almost half of the autonomous community's population live in the Bilbao metropolitan area, almost the entirety of the province of Biscay. Six of the ten most populous cities in the region form part of Bilbao's conurbation (Bilbao, Barakaldo, Getxo, Portugalete, Santurtzi and Basauri), which is widely known as Greater Bilbao.

Roman Catholicism is, by far, the largest religion in the Basque Country. In 2019, the proportion of Basques that identify themselves as Roman Catholic was 60%, while it is one of the most secularised communities of Spain: 24.6% were non-religious and 12.3% of Basques were atheist.

=== Languages ===
"Spanish Kingdoms in 1030". The first written record in Spanish and Basque are in the Glosas Emilianenses. The map shows the Kingdom of Pamplona between 1029 and 1035

Spanish and Basque are co-official in all territories of the autonomous community. The Basque-speaking areas in the modern-day autonomous community are set against the wider context of the Basque language, spoken to the east in Navarre and the French Basque Country. The whole Basque-speaking territory has experienced both decline and expansion in its history. The Basque language experienced a gradual territorial contraction throughout the last nine centuries, and very severe deterioration of its sociolinguistic status for much of the 20th century due to heavy immigration from other parts of Spain, the virtual nonexistence of Basque-language schooling, and national policies implemented by the different Spanish régimes (see Language policies of Francoist Spain). After the advent of the Statute of Autonomy of the Basque Country in 1982 following Franco's death, this reductive trend was gradually reversed thanks to the Basque-language schools and the new education system. Basque has always had a strong presence in most of Gipuzkoa, central and eastern Biscay and the northern edge of Álava, while most Basque speakers in western Biscay and the rest of Álava are second-language speakers.

The 2006 sociolinguistic survey of all Basque provinces showed that in 2006 of all people aged 16 and above in the Basque Autonomous Community, 30.1% were fluent Basque speakers, 18.3% passive speakers and 51.5% did not speak Basque. The percentage of Basque speakers was highest in Gipuzkoa (49.1% speakers) and lowest in Álava (14.2%). These results represent an increase on previous years (29.5% in 2001, 27.7% in 1996 and 24.1% in 1991). The highest percentage of speakers was now found in the 16–24 age range (57.5%), while only 25.0% of those 65 and older reported speaking Basque.

Ten years later, the sociolinguistic survey showed that in 2016 of all people aged 16 and above in the Basque Autonomous Community, 33.9% were fluent Basque speakers, 19.1% passive speakers and 47% did not speak Basque. The proportion of Basque speakers was again highest in Gipuzkoa (50.6%) and lowest in Álava (19.2%).

The 2021 sociolinguistic survey found that 36.2% of the population above age 16 spoke Basque, 18.6% were passive speakers and 45.3% did not speak Basque. In Gipuzkoa 51.8% spoke the language, in Biscay 30.6%, and in Álava 22.4% did.

=== Major cities ===
Largest municipalities in the Basque Country INE – 2025
Rank		Province	Pop.	Rank		Province	Pop.
1	Bilbao	Biscay	350,975	11	Leioa	Biscay	32,708
2	Vitoria-Gasteiz	Álava	260,402	12	Durango	Biscay	30,181
3	San Sebastián	Gipuzkoa	189,507	13	Sestao	Biscay	28,473
4	Barakaldo	Biscay	103,084	14	Eibar	Gipuzkoa	27,464
5	Getxo	Biscay	75,967	15	Galdakao	Biscay	24,767
6	Irun	Gipuzkoa	63,737	16	Erandio	Biscay	24,721
7	Santurtzi	Biscay	46,530	17	Zarautz	Gipuzkoa	23,467
8	Portugalete	Biscay	44,864	18	Mondragón	Gipuzkoa	22,411
9	Basauri	Biscay	40,262	19	Hernani, Gipuzkoa	Gipuzkoa	20,378
10	Errenteria	Gipuzkoa	39,341	20	Tolosa	Gipuzkoa	20,121

=== Migration ===
Foreign population by country of birth (2025)
Country of birth	Population
Colombia	45,495
Morocco	36,923
Nicaragua	19,345
Venezuela	18,209
Romania	14,230
Bolivia	13,293
Honduras	12,459
Peru	12,264
Paraguay	11,664
Ecuador	10,227
Algeria	9,391
Argentina	8,966
Brazil	8,006
Pakistan	7,837
Senegal	6,680

As of 2025, immigrants make up 14.3% of the population. The 5 largest foreign countries of birth are Colombia, Morocco, Nicaragua, Venezuela, and Romania.

With 30.2% of the population born outside of this autonomous community, immigration is crucial to Basque demographics. Over the 20th century most of this immigration came from other parts of Spain, typically from Galicia or Castile and León. Over recent years, sizeable numbers of this population have returned to their birthplaces and most immigration to the Basque country now comes from abroad, chiefly from South America.

== Cuisine ==
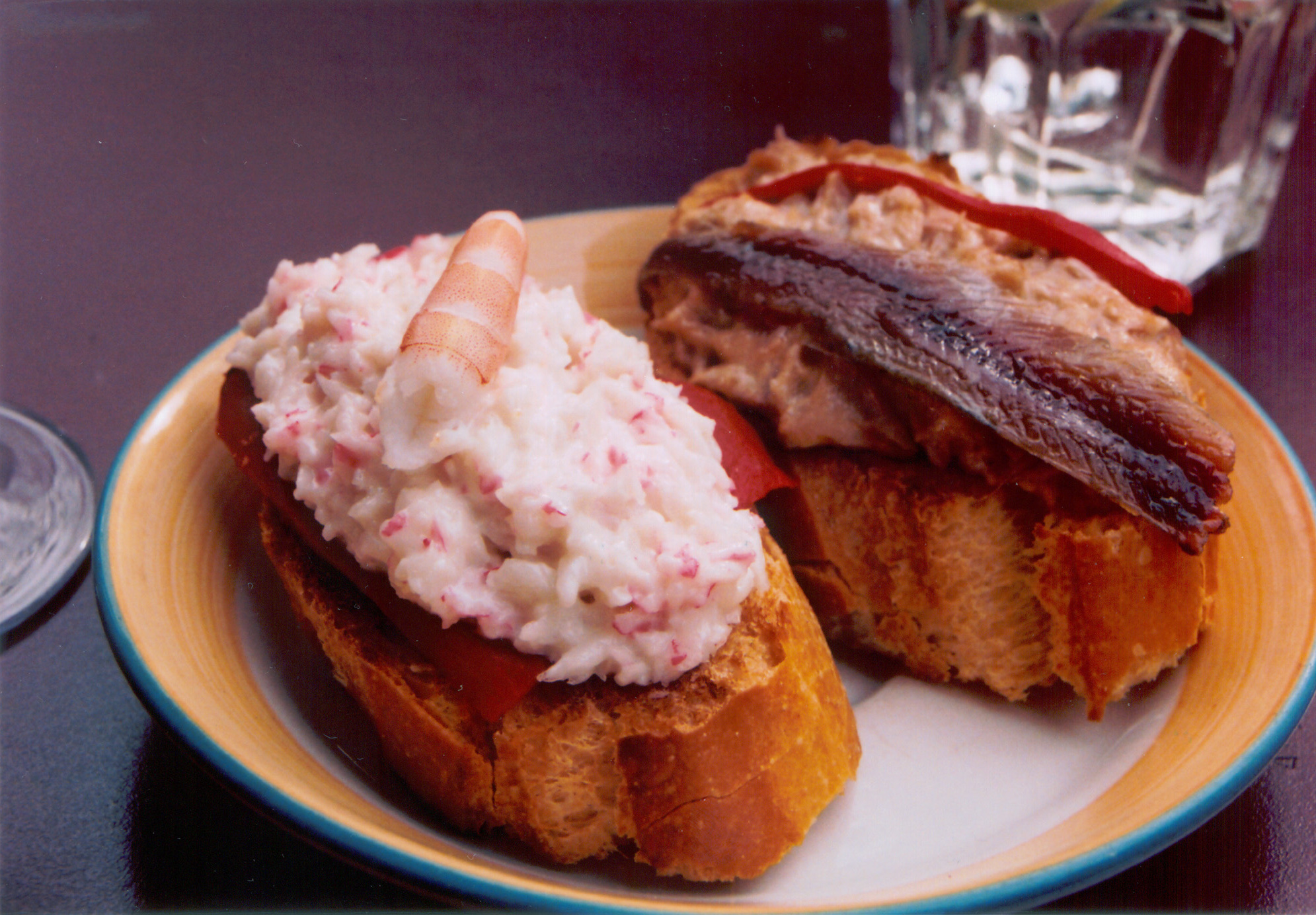
Two sample pintxos

Basque cuisine is an important part of Basque culture. According to the chef Ferran Adrià, San Sebastián "in terms of the average quality of the food, in terms of what you can get at any place you happen to walk into, maybe it is—probably it is, yes—the best in the world." The most popular dishes are seafood, fish (for example Marmitako) and "Pintxos", bar finger food.

During the 1970s, several chefs from the Basque Country, particularly Juan Mari Arzak and Pedro Subijana, led a gastronomic revolution, translating to Spain the principles of French nouvelle cuisine. The first Spanish restaurant to be awarded 3 stars in the Michelin Guide was, in fact, Zalacaín, a Basque restaurant, although located in Madrid. Today, the Basque Country, alongside Catalonia, is the Spanish region with a higher density of stars in the Michelin Guide, and it has become a preferred destination of many gastronomic tourists, both domestic and international. Four restaurants boast 3 stars, the highest possible award: Juan María Arzak (Arzak restaurant), Martín Berasategui (Berasategui restaurant), Pedro Subijana (chef of Akelarre) and Eneko Atxa (Azurmendi restaurant).

The coastal city of San Sebastián is home to the Basque Culinary Center, an academic research institution focused on higher education and research in the areas of gastronomy and nutrition.

Basque food is one of the reasons for tourism to the Basque Country, especially the pintxos. A popular way to socialise is "ir de pintxos" or txikiteo, a Basque version of a pub crawl, albeit generally more civilised.

== Economy ==
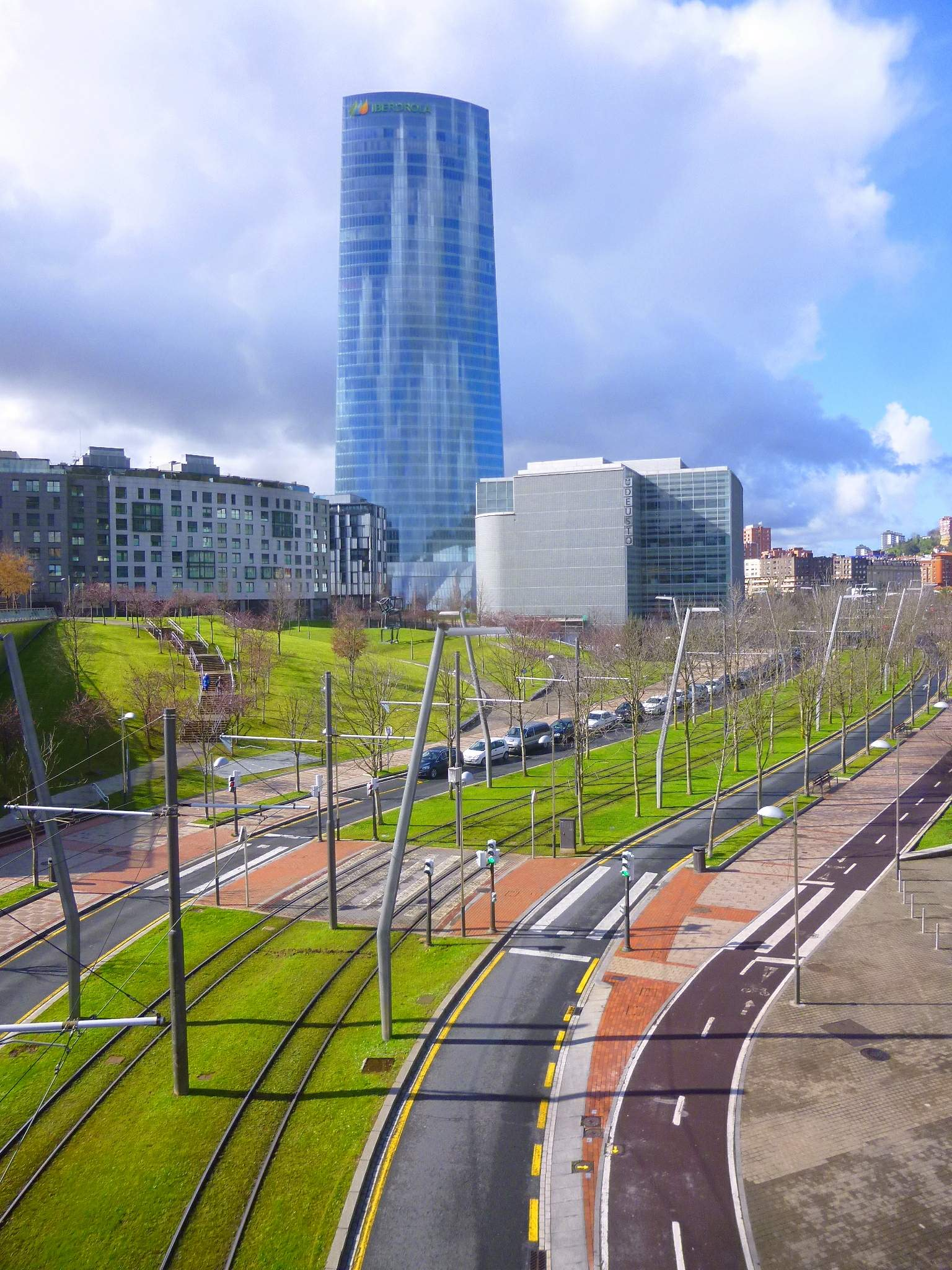
Iberdrola Tower in Bilbao

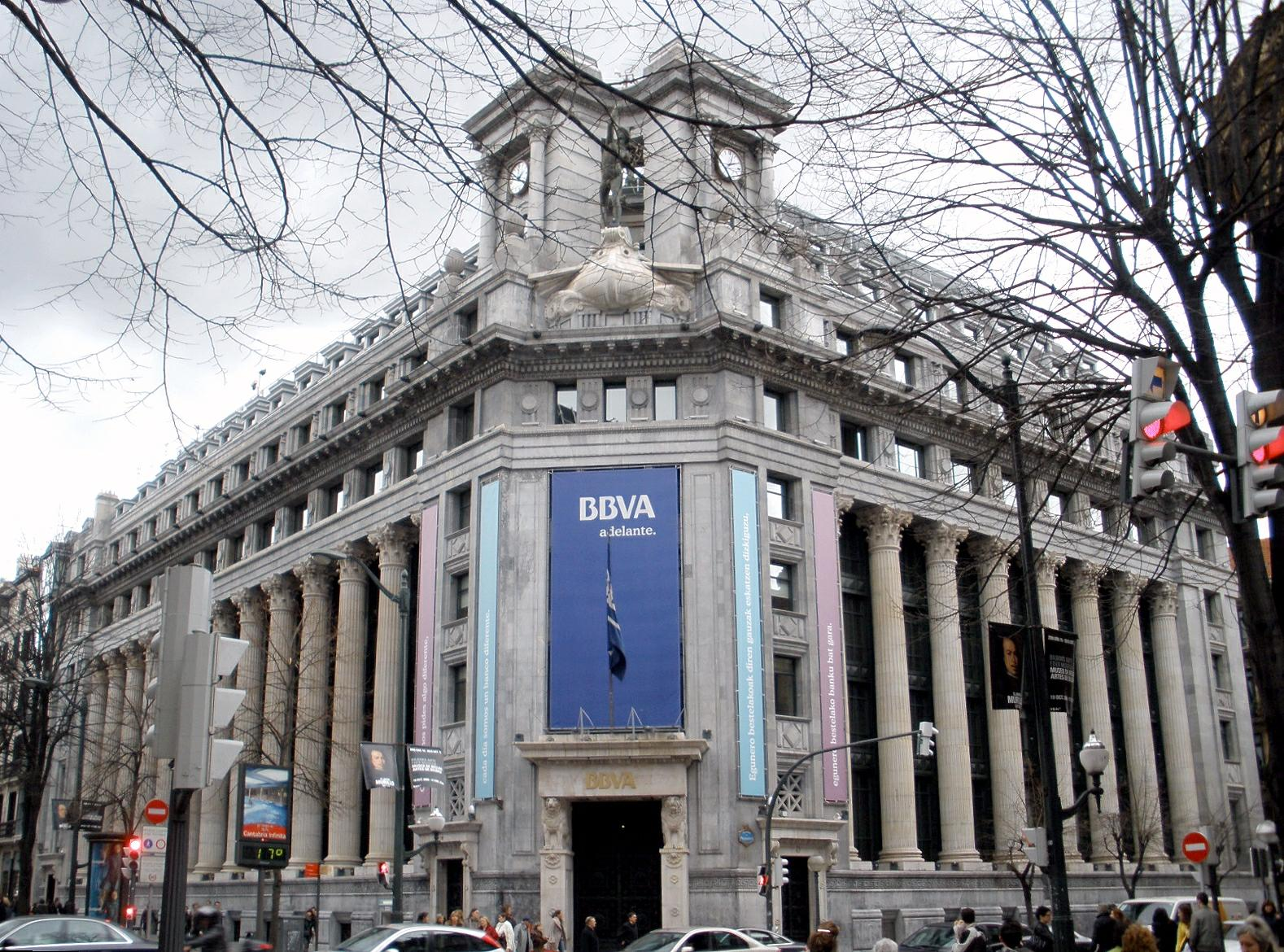
BBVA head-office building in Bilbao

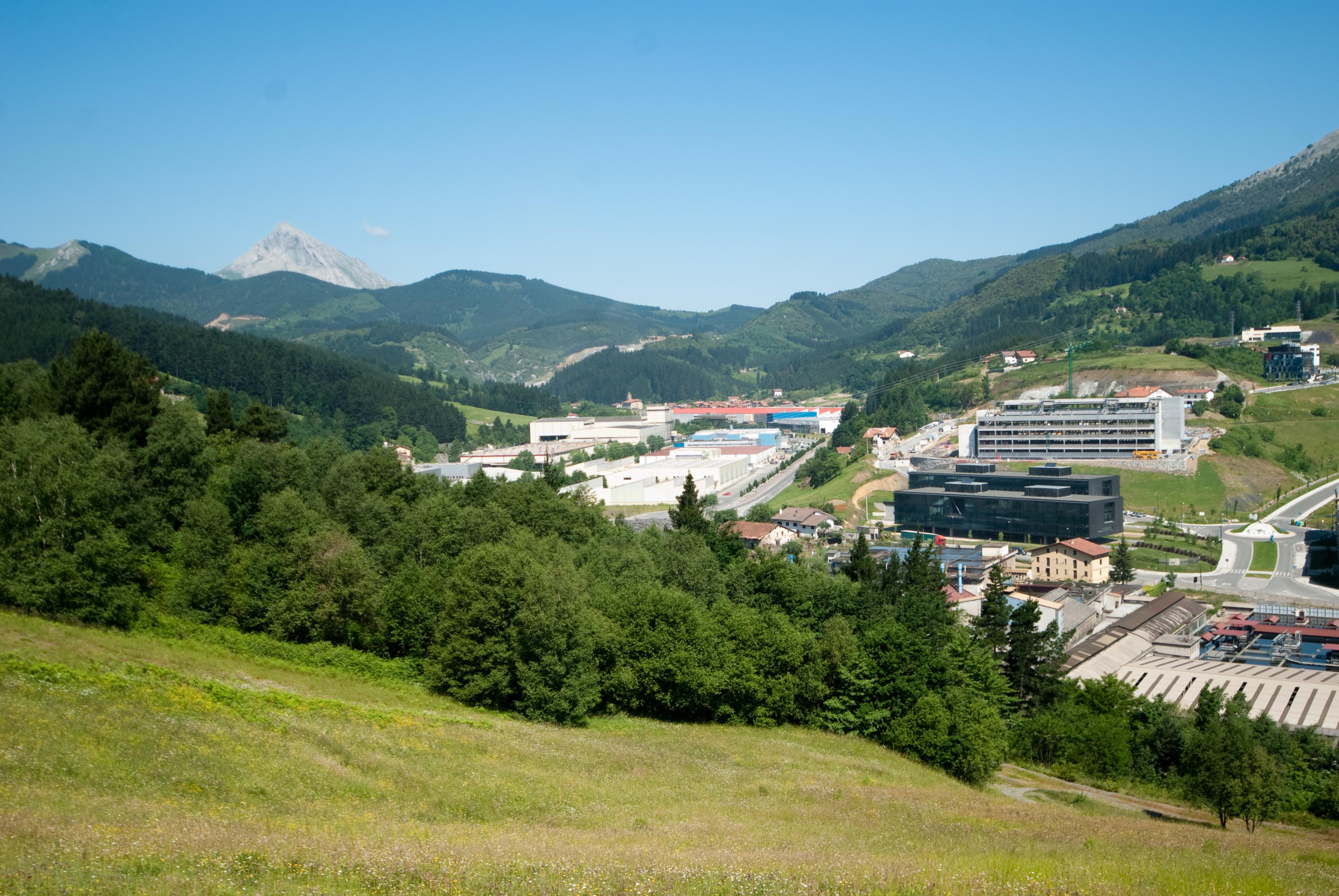
Garaia technology center in Mondragón, one of several science parks located in the Basque Country

The Basque Autonomous Community ranks first in Spain in terms of per capita product, it's the most economically productive region of the country with a gross domestic product (GDP) per capita (adjusted to purchasing power parity, PPP) being 22% higher than that of the European Union and 30% higher than Spain's average in 2016 at €34,400. In 2019, the community showed a surplus in public finances, at 0.3% of the GDP.

Industrial activities were traditionally centred on steel and shipbuilding, mainly due to the rich iron ore resources found during the 19th century around Bilbao. The Estuary of Bilbao was the centre of Euskadi's Industrial Revolution during the 19th and the first half of the 20th century. These activities decayed during the economic crisis of the 1970s and 1980s, giving ground for the development of the services sector and new technologies.

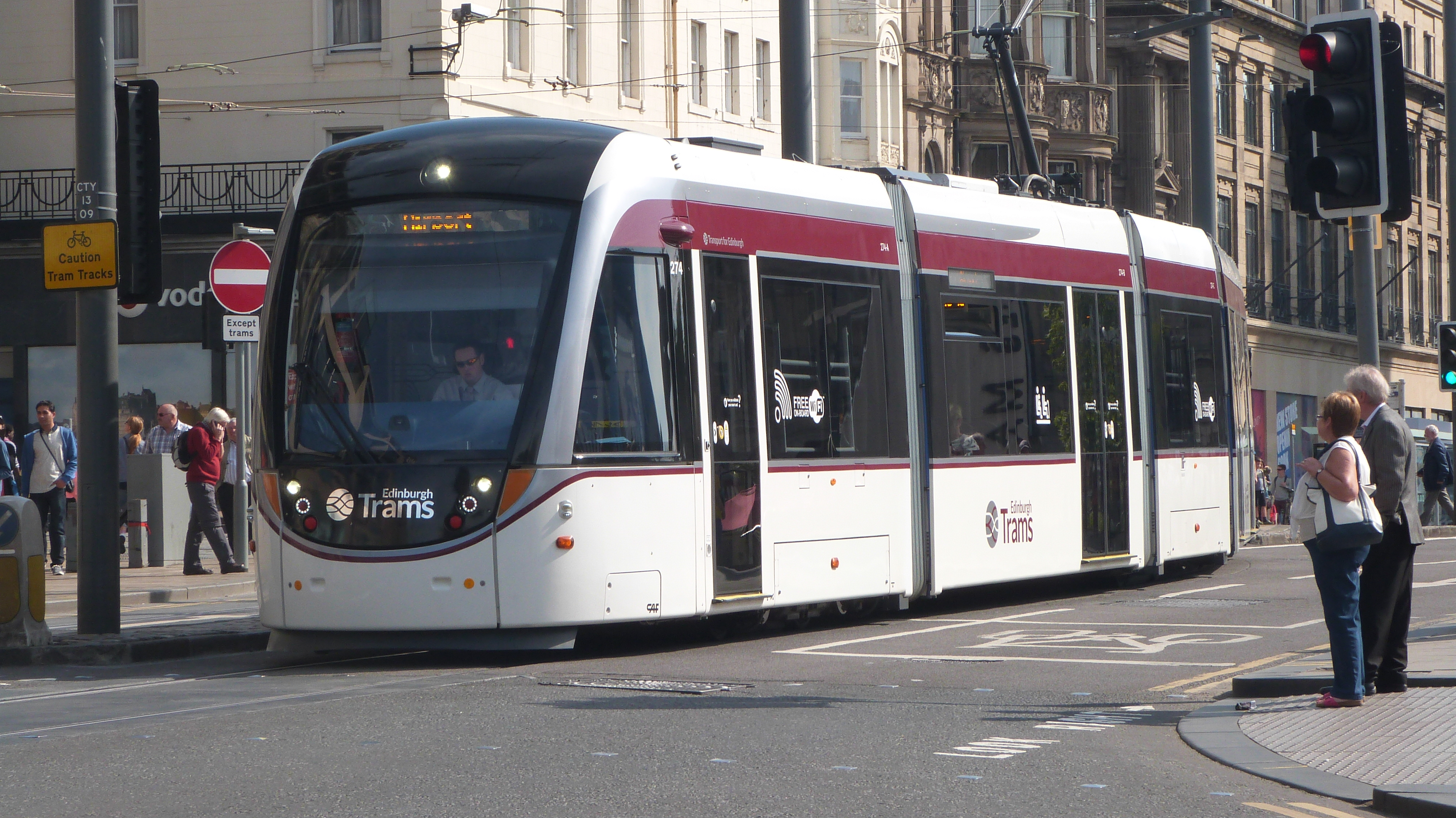
Edinburgh tram car assembled in CAF Beasain (Gipuzkoa)

Today, the strongest industrial sectors of the Basque Country's economy are the manufacturing sector, present in the valleys of Biscay and Gipuzkoa; aeronautics and logistics in Vitoria-Gasteiz; and finance and energy, in Bilbao.

The biggest companies in the Basque Country are: BBVA, one of the largest financial institutions in the world and Spain's second largest bank; the multinational energy company Iberdrola (both of them have their headquarters in Bilbao); Mondragón Cooperative Corporation, the largest cooperative in the world; railway vehicle manufacturer CAF and Gamesa, the world's second largest wind turbine manufacturer.

Eight out of ten Spanish municipalities with the lowest unemployment rates were found across this autonomous community in 2015, highlighting such towns as Arrasate, Portugalete and Barakaldo with a strong manufacturing industrial make-up. The Basque Autonomous Community ranked above other communities in Spain in terms of resilience in the face of the economic crisis, going on to become a beacon and a subject of study in Europe.

In 2013 the Basque Country outperformed Spain in several parameters, but economic overall figures were highly variable. Spanish figures are subject to conspicuous seasonal fluctuation, relying on its tourist and services sectors, while Basque performance is rather based on mid- and long-term results, according with its more industrial focus. In the last quarter of 2017, unemployment in this autonomous community rose to 11.1% (8.43% in Gipuzkoa), second lowest in Spain after Navarre, at a percentage slightly higher than the EU average (10.8%), but still ahead of the Spanish overall unemployment rate of around 16.55%, the second highest in the EU.

Unemployment rate (December data) (%)

Year	2006	2007	2008	2009	2010	2011	2012	2013	2014	2015	2016	2017	2018	2019
unemployment rate (in %)	6.9%	5.9%	8.5%	12.1%	11.0%	13.2%	16.6%	16.6%	16.6%	12.9%	12.3%	10.6%	9.6%	9.1%

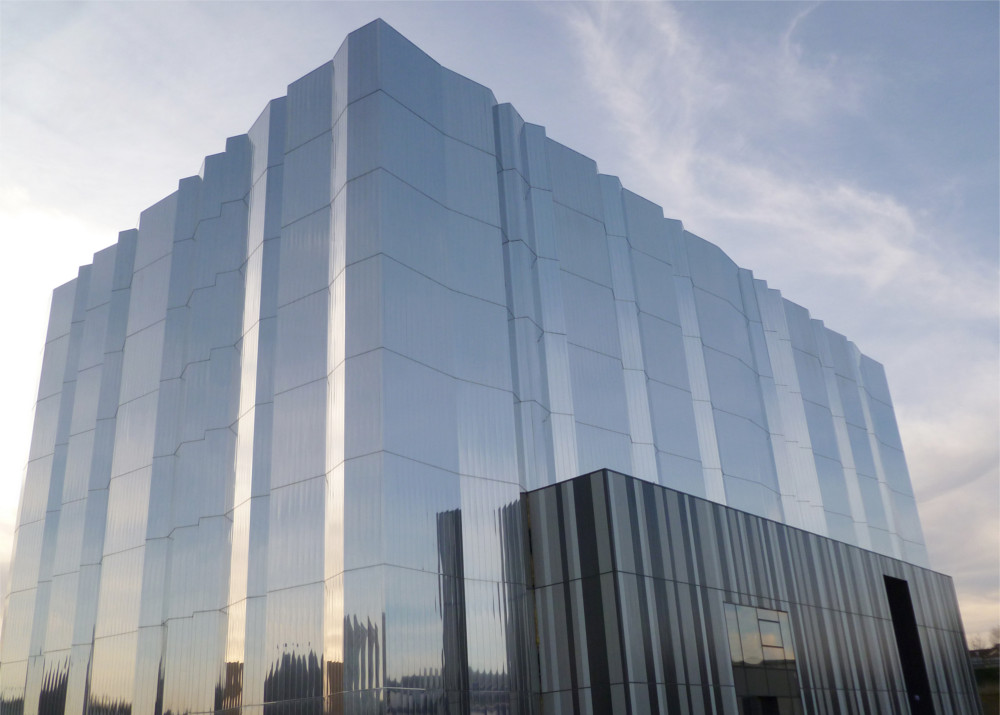
Ultra-High Voltage Laboratory of Arteche

In regards to GDP performance, 2017 was a remarkably positive year for the Basque Autonomous Community. It underwent an increase in GDP of 3.0%, close to the Spanish increase, 3.1%. In the last term of 2013, the public debt of the Basque Autonomous Community stood at 13.00% of its GDP, totalling €3,753 per capita, as compared to Spain's overall 93.90%, totalling €20,383 per capita.

The Basque Government's high-ranking officials, as well as Basque-based party leaders and personalities, have protested and voiced their concern over the detrimental effects of austerity measures passed by the Spanish Government as of 2011, overruling Basque taxation powers, may be having on industry and trade, especially export. Basque officials have strongly advocated for participation, along with Navarre, in the Ecofin, with a full membership, in order to defend Basque interests in line with Basque reality and fiscal status, and not as a Spanish subsidiary.

=== Transport ===
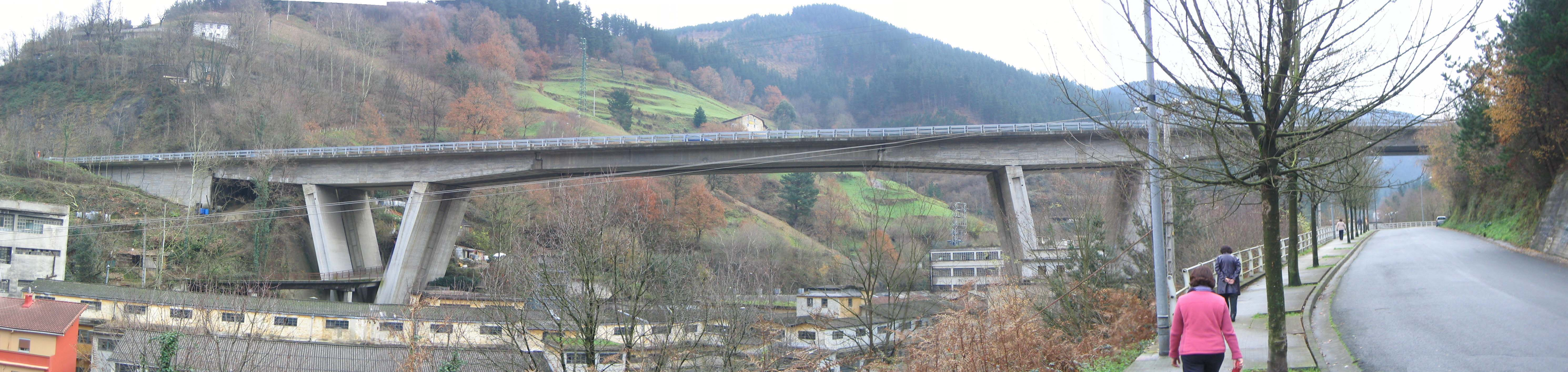
AP-8 motorway in Eibar

The strategic geographical location of the Basque Country as a link between the northwest and centre of Spain and the rest of Europe makes this territory heavily transited.

==== Road ====
The main backbones of road transport are the AP-8 motorway which links Bilbao, San Sebastián and the French border and the A-1 motorway which links San Sebastián and Vitoria-Gasteiz with central Spain. Other important routes include the AP-68 motorway which links Bilbao with the Mediterranean.

==== Rail ====
Euskal Trenbide Sarea (Basque Railway Network) is the Basque Government-owned company that maintains and creates the railway infrastructure in the autonomous region. Euskotren is the Basque Government-owned narrow gauge rail company that operates commuter services in Bilbao and San Sebastián, intercity Bilbao-San Sebastián service, and Euskotren Tranbia tram services in Bilbao and Vitoria-Gasteiz.

The Bilbao Metro operates two metro lines that serve the Greater Bilbao area while Euskotren operates a third which opened in 2017. Euskotren operates a metro-like service in the San Sebastián area.

The Spanish government owns two main Renfe broad gauge lines that link Vitoria-Gasteiz with San Sebastián and Bilbao with central Spain. It also operates Cercanías commuter lines in both Bilbao and San Sebastián.

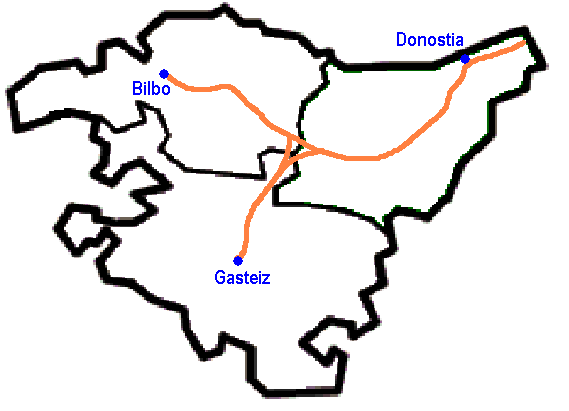
The Basque Y

The FEVE narrow gauge rail company operates a commuter line between Bilbao and Balmaseda and links Bilbao with the rest of northern Spain.

A new high-speed network (called Basque Y) currently under construction will link the three capitals in 'Y' formation. Because of the rough geography of the territory, most of the network will run through tunnels, with a total estimated cost of up to €10 billion.

The estimated ecological impact of the project has encouraged the formation of a group campaigning against it called AHTrik Ez Elkarlana. The group uses social disobedience to oppose the project and promotes referendums against it in the towns it most affects. In spite of the vocal opposition to the project by this and other community groups (as well as EH Bildu), work continues, not without uncertainty. In early 2015, an estimate suggested that the average Basque intercity fare would rise to a non-competitive €25, while the Spanish central government's funding has been subject to continuous delays, spurring the irritation of the Basque government in Vitoria-Gasteiz.

==== Airports ====
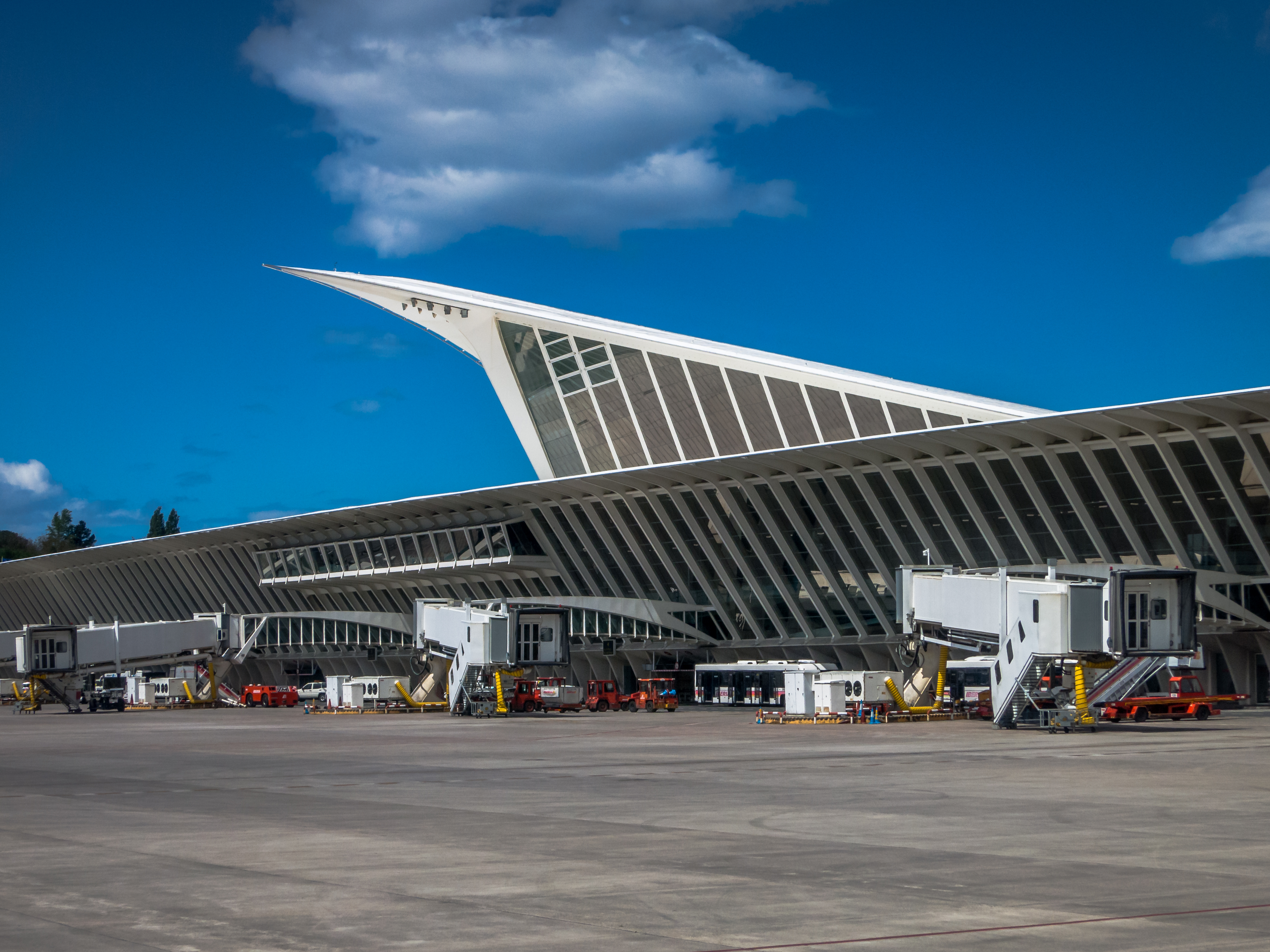
Bilbao Airport

The three capitals have airports:

- Bilbao Airport (BIO) International
- Vitoria Airport (VIT)
- San Sebastián Airport (EAS)

Of the three, the most important hub and entry point to the Basque Country is Bilbao Airport, offering many international connections. Nearly 4,600,000 passengers passed through it in 2016.

==== Seaports ====
The two most important ports are the Port of Bilbao and the Port of Pasaia. There are also minor fishing ports, such as Bermeo and Ondarroa.

The Port of Bilbao is by far the most important in the Basque Country and the north of Spain, being the fourth most important in Spain with over 38 million tons of traffic.

All cruising routes arrive in Bilbao and there is a ferry service linking Bilbao with Portsmouth (United Kingdom).

== Sport ==
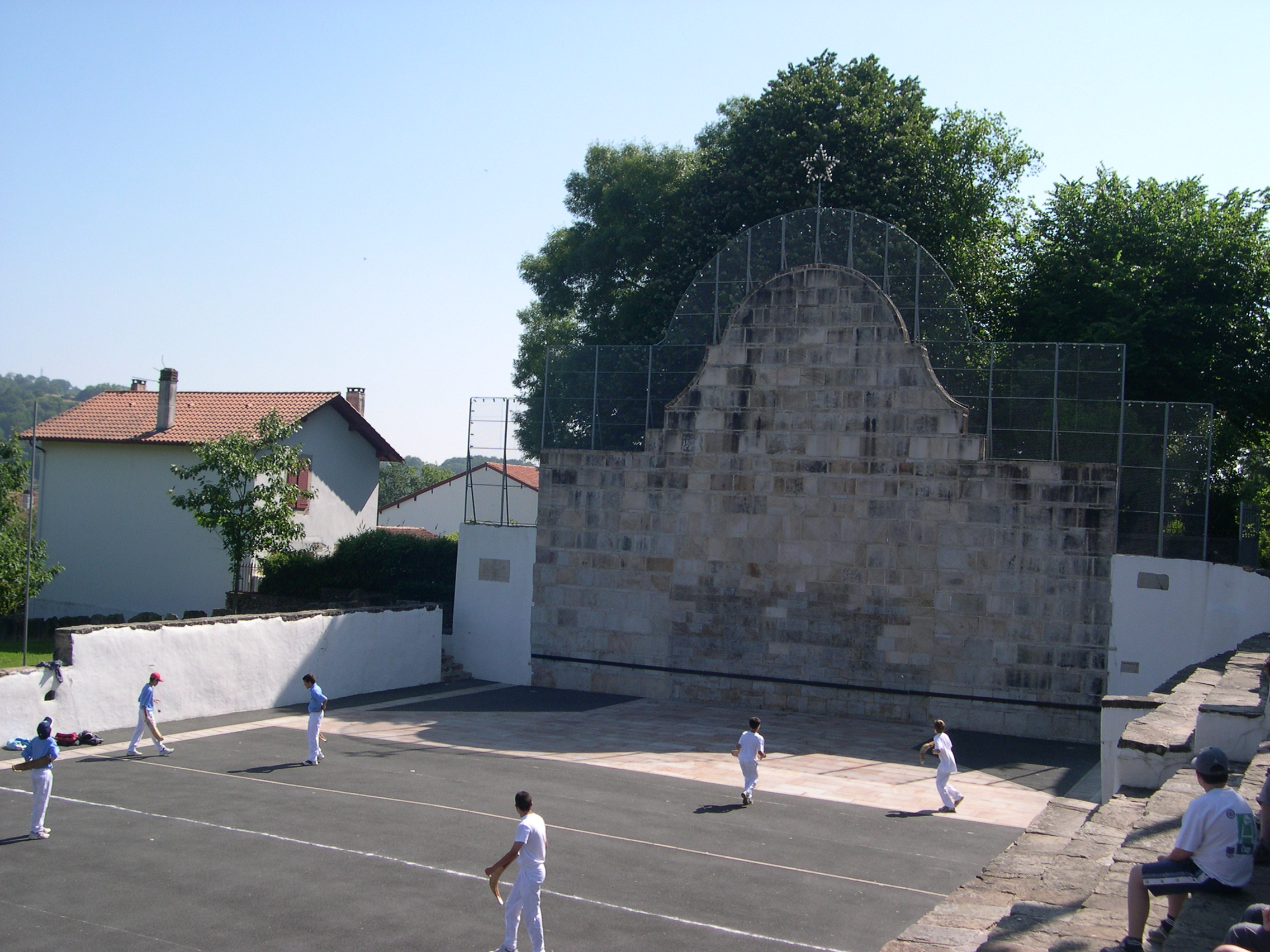
Pelota (jai alai) court in Sara, Lapurdi.

Basque rural sports, known as Herri Kirolak in Basque, are a number of sports competitions rooted in the traditional lifestyles of the Basque people, for example Basque pelota, the Basque version of the European game family that includes real tennis and squash. Basque players, playing for either the Spanish or the French teams, dominate international competitions.

The Basque country is also home to former national football champions Athletic Club from Bilbao. It has a strict Cantera policy of employing only players born or trained in the Basque Country (greater region). Athletic's policy does not apply to head coaches, with famous names as Howard Kendall and Jupp Heynckes coaching the team at various points. In spite of this, the club shares with worldwide heavyweights Real Madrid and FC Barcelona the distinction of never being relegated from the top flight.

Another major Basque Country club is Real Sociedad from San Sebastián, who contest the Basque derby with Athletic. Real Sociedad used to practise the same policy, until they signed Irish striker John Aldridge in the late 1980s. Since then, Real Sociedad have had many foreign players. Xabi Alonso became the only Basque player to win both the World Cup and the Champions League and he played in Real Sociedad. The region is also home to another La Liga club Deportivo Alavés.

The most renowned Basque footballer of all time is possibly Andoni Zubizarreta who holds the record for appearances in La Liga with 622 games and has won six league titles and the European Cup. Nowadays, the best known Basque football player is Xabi Alonso, winner of two UEFA European Championships and one World Cup, who played for Real Sociedad, Liverpool, Real Madrid and Bayern Munich, but retired in 2017. Other notable Basque players include Mikel Arteta, Asier Illarramendi, Andoni Iraola, Aritz Aduriz, Mikel Oyarzabal, Xabi Prieto and Ander Herrera. Both Athletic and Real Sociedad have won the Spanish league, including dominating the competition in the early 1980s, with the last title won by a Basque club being Athletic's 1984 title.

At international level, Basque players were especially prominent in Spanish selections prior to the Civil War, with all of those at the 1928 Olympics, and the majority of the 1920 Olympics and 1934 World Cup squads, born in the region. There is an unofficial 'national' team which plays occasional friendlies, however its squads pick players from the wider territory including Navarre and the French Basque Country.

Cycling as a sport is popular in the Basque Country. Abraham Olano has won the Vuelta a España and the World Championship. The UCI World Tour Movistar Team hails from the Basque Country. Also previously known as Caisse d'Épargne, the Movistar team traces its history back to the Banesto team that included Miguel Induráin. The region is home to the Tour of the Basque Country stage race and the Clásica de San Sebastián one day race. The Euskaltel–Euskadi team was also part of the World Tour until its disbandment in 2014. It was an unofficial Basque national team and was partly funded by the Basque Government. Its riders were either Basque, or at least grown up in the Basque cycling culture, and former members of the team have been strong contenders in the Tour de France held annually in July and Vuelta a España held in September. Team leaders have included riders such as Iban Mayo, Haimar Zubeldia, Samuel Sánchez, David Etxebarria, Igor Antón, Mikel Landa and Mikel Nieve. The team was revived in 2020 at UCI ProTeam level when Euskaltel reinstated its sponsorship.

== Notable people ==
Some of the most notable Basque people from this administrative jurisdiction include:

- Francisco de Vitoria, philosopher who set the theories of just war, international law and freedom of commerce
- Juan Sebastián Elcano, completed first circumnavigation of the Earth
- Ignatius of Loyola, founder of the Jesuits
- Don Juan de Oñate, explorer of the great plains and Colorado river
- Blas de Lezo, naval strategist, best remembered for his defensive tactics at the Battle of Cartagena de Indias
- Jorge Oteiza and Eduardo Chillida, sculptors
- Andrés Nagel Tejada, artist, sculptor, and architect
- Paco Rabanne, fashion designer
- Cristóbal Balenciaga, fashion designer
- Xabi Alonso, Mikel Arteta, Pako Ayestaran, Andoni Iraola, Unai Emery, Julen Lopetegui, Jose Luis Mendilibar, and Mikel Oyarzabal, footballers
- Edurne Pasaban, first woman to climb all of the fourteen eight-thousand peaks in the World
- Elena Arzak, best female chef in the world (2012)
- Jon Kortajarena, male model
- Jose-Maria Cundin, artist
- Fernando Savater philosopher
- Miguel de Unamuno, essayist, novelist, poet, playwright, and philosopher
- Jon Rahm, golfer

== See also ==
- Basque Country (greater region)
- Basque mythology
- Basque breeds and cultivars
- Livestock in the Basque Country
- Vineyards of the Basque Country
