= Plaiaundi =

Coordinates: 43°20′52″N 1°47′41″W

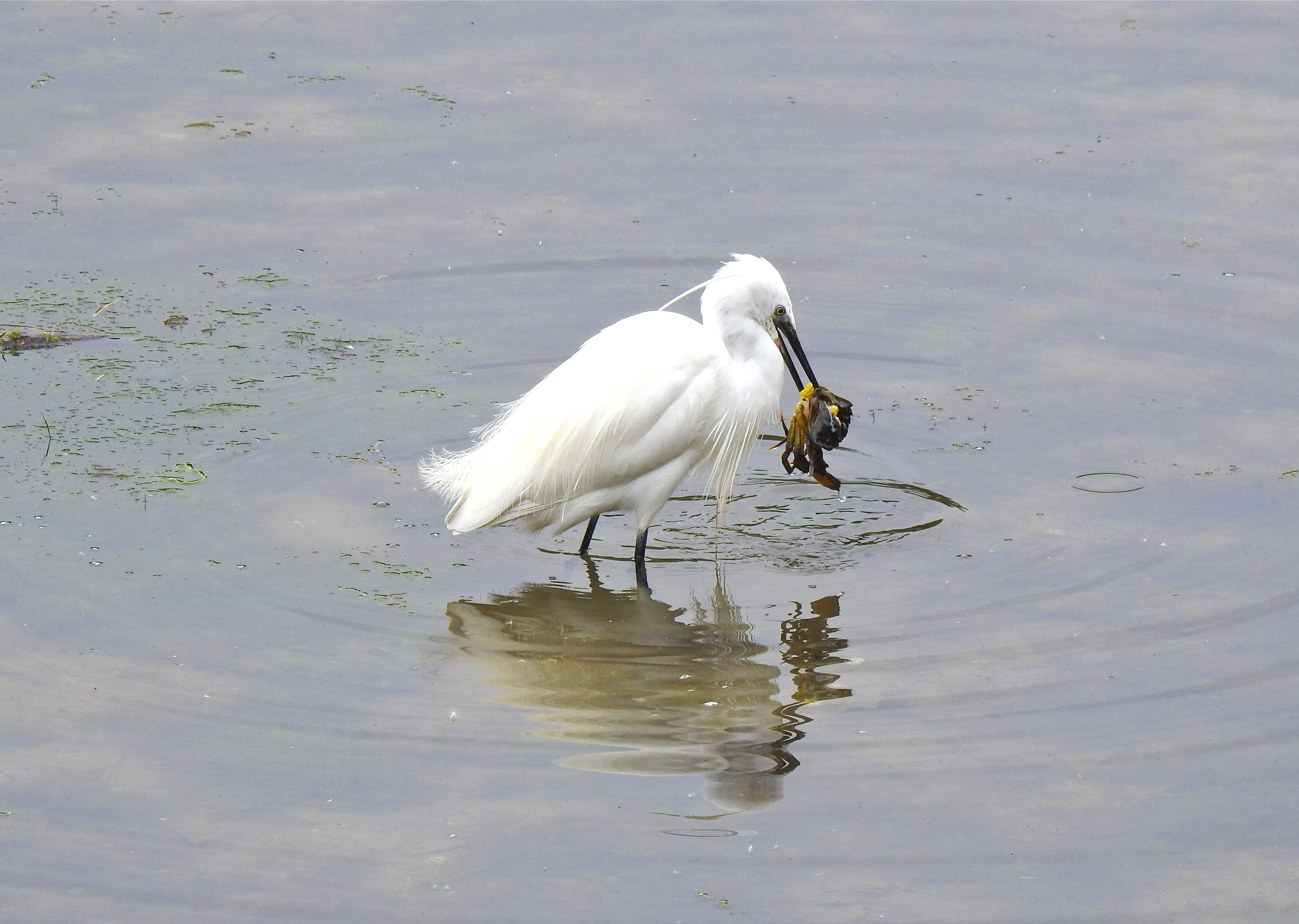
Little egret in the Plaiaundi Ecological Park.

The Plaiaundi Ecological Park is a 24-hectare coastal wetland lying where the Bidasoa River meets the sea in the Bay of Biscay. This is in the Basque country of northern Spain, close to the border with France. It is near Irun and Hondarribia in Gipuzkoa, Spain, and Hendaia in France. The confluence of the sea and river has made the area an important site for migratory birds, with an average of 175 bird species recorded per year. It is a natural flora and fauna reserve. The park contains three lagoons, two of which are tidal, and a beach.

== Tidal movements ==
Water levels in the tidal lagoons can be managed by adjustable sluice gates. At low tide, birds forage on the exposed mudflats for crustaceans, worms and molluscs. At high tide they roost on islets or continue feeding in areas unaffected by the tides.

== Biodiversity ==
The nature of Plaiaundi consists of a wide variety of flora (visitors view them mainly in the spring) and fauna (visitors with binoculars arrive all during the year, because of the birds migratory habits).

=== Flora ===
In the park there are different plant species, all of which have had to adapt to the extremes of conditions of the wetlands. The typical flora of the wetlands, which are called halophiles, are located in areas where the tide brings salt water twice a day. Each species can tolerate only a certain amount of salt. For this reason, they are distributed in strips to resist the tide.

The hardier plants, such as the salt grass, are found in the lower part of the park, to which only some species have adapted. Higher in the park are other species, like the Ammophila arenaria (European beachgrass), and Cytisus striatus (Portuguese broom). This higher level is covered by salt water only in the spring, by the spring tides, so more plant varieties are adapted to this habitat. Other species also live here, such as green seaweeds and plants like the herbaceous plant Paspalum vaginatum. sedges grow on the banks of the lakes.

The dry area is occupied by Poaceae (grasses), which provide food for many insects, birds and small mammals. Also found in this area are many common herbaceous flowers such as bird's foot trefoil, Scrophularia auriculata, Ranunculus acris, Lathyrus, Serapias cordigera and Lychnis flos-cuculi.

Among the main trees and bushes are Platanus racemosa, willows, Nothofagus obliqua, Tamarix.

=== Fauna ===
This nature park contains a variety of birds, reptiles, mammals and insects.

Birds: Resident birds include the little grebe, European shag, common kingfisher, water rail and peregrine falcon, which can be found in the park throughout the year.

In the Summer- Autumn season: Little ringed plover, red-backed shrike, Eurasian reed warbler and grasshopper warbler.

In the Winter-Spring season: Great northern diver, great cormorant, black-necked grebe, red-breasted merganser, common shelduck, grey plover, dunlin, common snipe, Eurasian curlew, razorbill, common murre, reed bunting and some other Anatidae and gulls.

Migratory birds: Due to there being a geographic point of interest for the migratory birds, we can watch species like the Eurasian spoonbill, Cory's shearwater, great black-backed gull, terns, Ciconiiformes and less frequent species.

Amphibians, fishes and invertebrates

There is a good selection of aquatic fauna, like the flathead mullet, righteye flounder and Anguillidae. Amphibians found here are the green frog, palmate newt and natterjack toad. Mammals are not as frequent in the area, but like in other places with the same type habitat there are some species of shrew, common vole, mice and the least weasel (an introduced species).

== Nature calendar ==
Flora and Fauna during each month of the year:

- January: Loons, cormorants and shags, Anatidaes and some waders show up. Sparrows form their own living groups. The halophyte plants remain dry. The Almond Willow flowers in a large display of color.
- February: The first frogs appear.
- March: The Little Ringed Plovers appear and start singing. Plenty of Natterjack Toad frogs croaking at night. Many trees budding, with sprouts of Willow, Common reed, Halophiles, and Common Alder.
- April: Pairs of Little Ringed Plovers in abundance. The migration increases with waders, insectivores and other types of birds showing up.
- May: First chicks appear of the Little Ringed Plover. Large quantities of many aquatic insects and fishes are visible in the water. The park is full of various flowers.
- July: Dragonflies are numerous and very active as the sun dries the puddles from the rains. Filamentous algae’s grow at amazing rates in the waters.
- August: The migration out of the park starts of the insectivore birds, Acrocephalus warblers and the Old World warblers. The amphibians begin to prepare to spend the winter in hibernation.
- September: The rate of migration speeds up; herons, cormorants, gulls, anatidaes, waders and many of the little birds leave for other parts of the world.
- November: Some birds pass along the park like geese and cranes. From the North the American robin is seen along with pipits and mosquitoes. The frogs hibernate.
