= Jose-Maria Cundin =

Spanish painter and sculptor

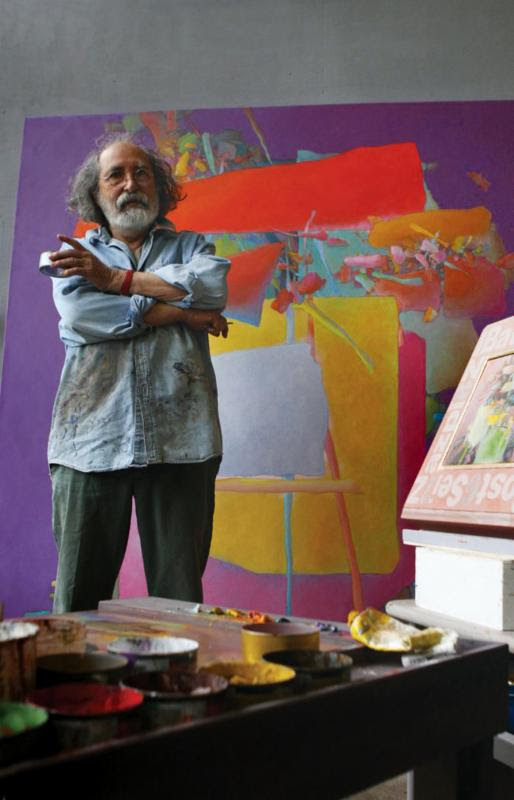
- Born: March 19, 1938 (age 88); Getxo, Basque Country
- Occupation: Artist

José-Maria Cundin is a Spanish painter and sculptor. He was born in Getxo, Basque Country Spain on March 19, 1938. His professional trajectory expands more than a half-century and across three continents. In his native Basque Country he is regarded as an outstanding advocate of the historical Avant Garde and is renowned globally as a master colorist across multiple mediums.

== Biography ==
He attended El Colegio de los Hermanos De La Salle, Deusto, Biscay, Spain and the Escuela de Altos Estudio Mercantiles in Bilbao. He also studied at The Institute of Artes y Oficios, Academia Sindical de Bellas Artes, and Museo de Reproducciones Artisticas in Bilbao.

Cundin traveled to Bogotá, Colombia in 1956 shortly after his 18th birthday. He held his first solo exhibitions there in Bogotá, Medellín and Barranquilla. He established residence in New York in 1958, before settling in New Orleans in 1964. He now resides in Folsom, Louisiana. Over the years he has also resided and exhibited in Bilbao, Miami, Paris, Bruges, Belgium, Annapolis, Maryland and in the 70's he spent long periods exhibiting and teaching in San Miguel de Allende and Mexico City, Mexico. Over the years he has held more than 40 solo shows and participated in numerous collective exhibitions. His works have been featured in many books, magazines and literary journals with the latest for the cover of The Southern Review. His works hang in the permanent collections of The Museum of Bellas Artes, Bilbao, ARTIUM, Vitoria, Basque Country, Spain, The New Orleans Museum of Art, Museum of Antioquia, Colombia, Johnson & Wales University His work is in numerous private and corporate collections including in the Basque Country, Spain, France, England, Germany, Australia, Canada, Mexico, Argentina, Brazil and Colombia.

He married Marion Gill from Dublin, Ireland on January 5, 1979, in Bilbao. They have one son, Ignacio, and José-Maria has three more sons, Fernando, Luisiana, and Gorriaran Cundin.

Art

Cundin's art has gone through a number of constantly shifting styles throughout his extensive career. His early work espoused representation art, depicting people through portraits. He shifted from this style around 1989, entering two new streams: plastic art (e.g., "Charity Hospital") and abstract art. In the latter style, he toyed with the concept of his old portraits, using abstract, colorful blocks to create what he called "Portraits, Self-portraits, Anti-portraits, and Pseudo-portraits."

Perhaps his most well-known work is a limited edition engraving of the Declaration of Independence, which he designed, directed, and produced in 1991. The work was hand-engraved on a brass plate and printed on hand-made paper from the Basque Country. Cundin gathered a team of Basque specialists to complete the engraving, which at the time was the first of its kind in 150 years.

After living under the dictatorship of Francisco Franco in Spain, the proclamation of freedom in the Declaration greatly appealed to Cundin. He chose it for its permanence, calling it "the national tattoo."

George Bush, president of the U.S. at the time, received the first copy of Cundin's engraving. The second went to King Juan Carlos of Spain. The work is now displayed in many prestigious collections, including that of the United States Congress, the Society Daughters of the American Revolution, and the University of Virginia.
