= Tourism in the Basque Autonomous Community =

Tourism in the Basque Autonomous Community has increased considerably in recent years, and is a popular destination for tourists from Spain and France. According to data from the Eustat the number of tourists entering the region in the year 2009 was 1,991,790, with the final result still pending. 71% of the yearly visitors come from the rest of Spain; the greatest number from Madrid Autonomous Community (14.2%), and Catalonia (11.1%). International visitors make up the remaining 29% - the largest percent come from France (7.2%). 62% of the people who come to the Basque Autonomous Community visit one of the three capitals, 27% visit inland and 11% visit the coast. The average stay of the visitors is 2 days.

272 establishments possess the Q award, a certificate denoting quality in the Spanish tourism sector. In the Basque Autonomous Community 140 tourist establishments, including hotels, apartments and tourist offices, among others, have the Accessibility Seal from a program which advises tourist establishments how to improve their ability to serve customers with physical and intellectual difficulties and visual and hearing impairment.

== Tourist resources ==
=== Cuisine and wine ===
The Basque Country's cuisine is one of its best-known strengths, in fact the city of San Sebastián has the second largest concentration of Michelin stars per square metre in the world. Wines from La Rioja Alavesa are produced within the control framework of the Qualified Denomination of Origin of Rioja. Other wine-growing denominations of origin are Chacoli, (from Biscay, Álava and Getaria), and Alvarinho, a semi-sparkling white wine.

The Pintxos (tapas) are also served in some bars, also called cooking in miniature, giving rise in places to a Basque Nouvelle Cuisine.

=== Bilbao ===
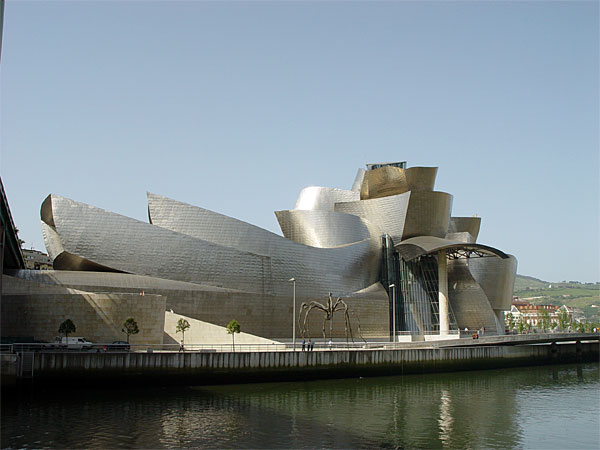
Guggenheim Bilbao Museum

Bilbao is the region's most cosmopolitan and densely populated city which, since the nineties, has greatly altered its character and appearance, including some avant-garde architecture. Titanium protects the Guggenheim Museum Bilbao, designed by Frank Gehry, and the entrances to the metro, covered by glass, were designed by Norman Foster. Other new urban developments are the Towers designed by the Japanese architect Arata Isozaki, and the Bilbao Airport by Santiago Calatrava. Another of the city's attractions is the neoclassical Arriaga Theatre.

Old Town, or Siete Calles/Zazpikale ("Seven Streets"), starts by the Arriaga Theatre. Old Town contains Plaza Nueva (New Square), Santiago Cathedral and, at one end, the Ribera Market. Very close by is the Gran Vía, Bilbao's main shopping street. In recent years Bilbao has recovered both banks of the ria for leisure activities. Loading docks have been replaced by avenues with works of architecture such as the Calatrava walkway. Among its notable events are Aste Nagusia, celebrated every year in mid-August, and the Santo Tomás Fair.

=== San Sebastián ===
San Sebastian is the capital of Gipuzkoa, located between Mounts Urgull and Igeldo, Santa Clara Island and La Concha Bay. It is currently a modern services city whose "Ensanche" (urban expansion) remains intact, with French-style streets and buildings which were erected at the end of the 19th century to accommodate the European bourgeoisie. In recent years the city has added attractions such as the Kursaal Centre, designed by Rafael Moneo and avant-garde works such as the Peine del Viento (Wind Comb), by the sculptor Eduardo Chillida. In October 2011 it was selected as the Spanish city with the best cuisine in Europe in the 1st edition of the Traveller's Choice ‘Food & Wine’ awards.

From the Bretxa Market, source of fresh seasonal produce, one may enter the Parte Vieja/Parte Zaharra (Old Town), with narrow lanes which are home to some of the oldest buildings, such as San Vicente Church and San Telmo Museum, the old Dominican monastery. This area is the location of a large bulk of the pintxo (tapa) bars which have made cooking in miniature famous. The city has also gained some international fame for its culture, and was named as the European Capital of Culture for 2016. It is worth highlighting the International Film Festival (Nazioarteko Zinemaldia), in September, the Jazz Festival (Jazzaldia) and the Musical Fortnight (Musika Hamabostaldia), in summer, and the Horror and Fantasy Film Festival, in autumn.

=== Vitoria-Gasteiz ===
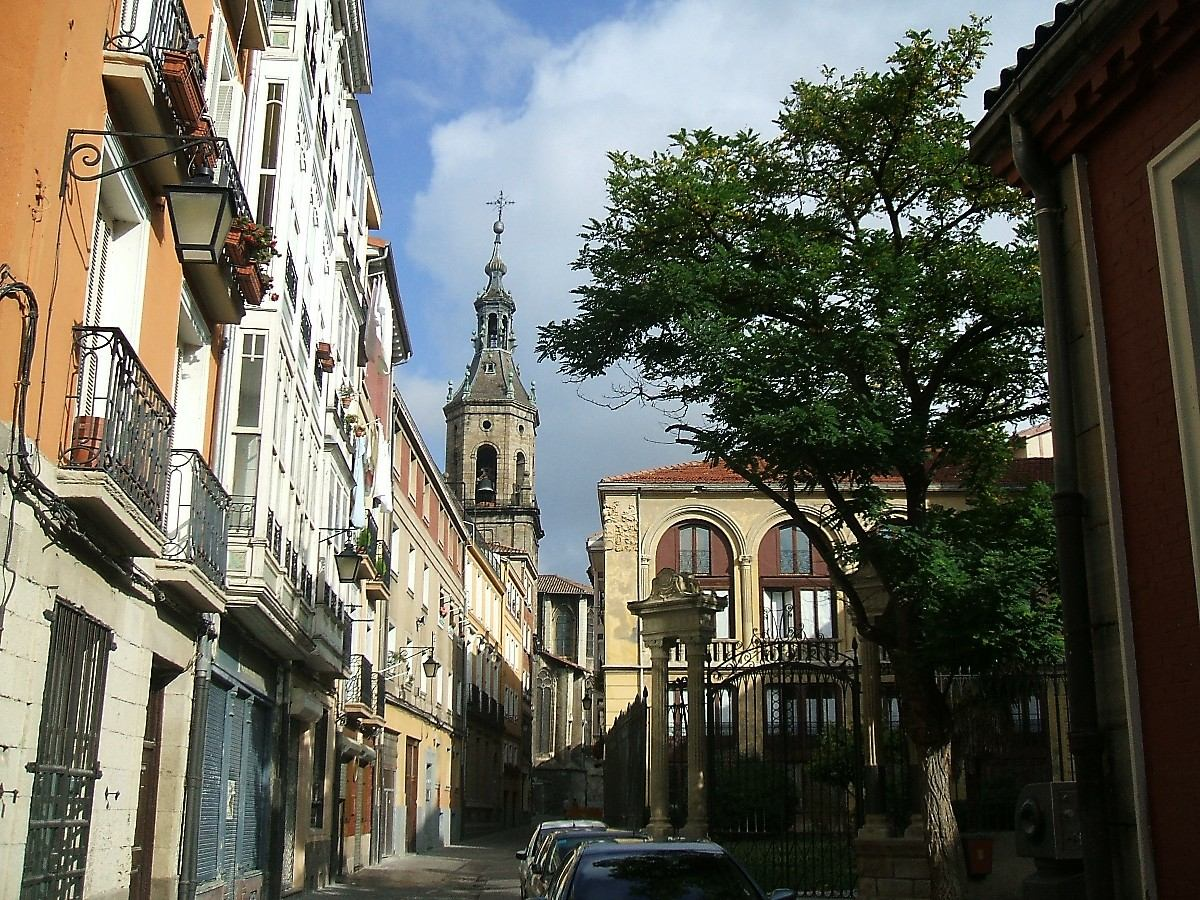
Vitoria-Gasteiz

Vitoria-Gasteiz is the capital of Álava, the political and administrative centre of the Autonomous Community and the headquarters of the Basque Government. It is renowned for its nature and its environmentalism, thanks to the a large number of pedestrian areas and one of the highest green space indexes per capita in the whole of Europe. On 22 October 2010, the European Commission chose the city of Vitoria-Gasteiz as the European Green Capital 2012. Its biggest urban jewel is its old town, originating from the Middle Ages, which is set on a hill and full of narrow streets with names which bring to mind past trades (Cutler, Blacksmith, Cobbler...). It is almond-shaped and contains small Renaissance palaces and Roman buildings, in addition to shops, pubs and other cultural spaces. This is the location of the church of San Miguel, home to the patron saint, the White Virgin, and Santa María Cathedral, whose restored works which are open to the public inspired the writer Ken Follett to write his novel World Without End in 2007.

Beyond the medieval town, the Ensanche (19th century expansion) is the main shopping area of the city, with large pedestrian areas and spaces such as the Plaza de la Virgen Blanca (White Virgin Square) or the Plaza de España, arcaded and Neoclassical. In addition to the urban gardens it is worth highlighting the Green Ring, with seven parks (Alegría, Armentia, Errekaleor, Olarizu, Salburua, Zabalgana and Zadorra), the result of a plan for the restoration and environmental recovery of the outskirts of the city.

=== Rioja Alavesa ===
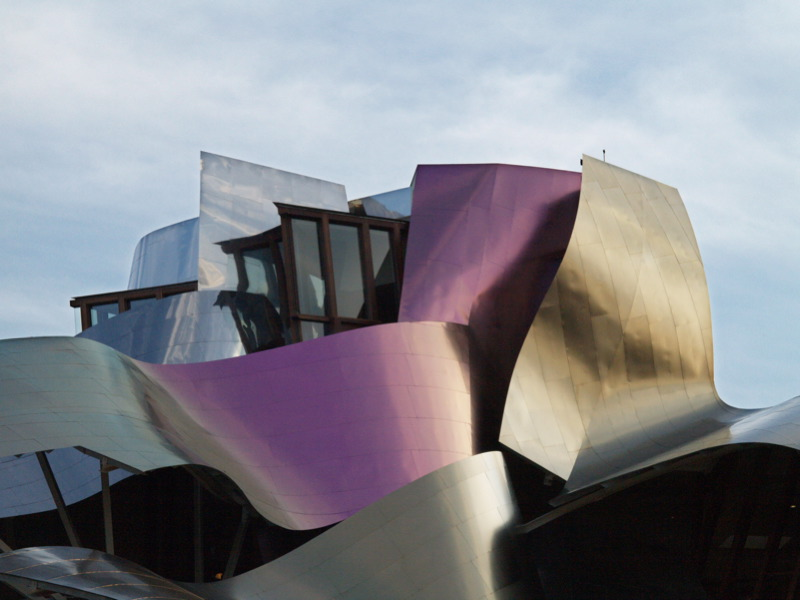
Marqués de Riscal

Twenty centuries ago, the Romans arrived at Rioja Alavesa bringing with them vine plants and forever changing the destiny of the region. Located between the rocky Cantabrian Mountains and the River Ebro, Rioja Alavesa has one of Europe's most deeply rooted wine-producing traditions. The region is home to many wineries. The restoration of many of their facilities has been entrusted to renowned architects, resulting in a curious combination of harvesting tradition and visual modernity. The main exponents of this architectural revolution are the Ysios winery, by Santiago Calatrava; the Marqués de Riscal winery, by Frank Gehry; the Viña Real winery, by Philippe Mazieres and the Baigorri winery, by Iñaki Aspiazu. The wine produced in Rioja Alavesa is complemented by many other wineries of all shapes and sizes, ranging from those managed as small businesses to those which are a family tradition. Most of them offer the opportunity to go on a guided tour, to discover their facilities and learn about wine production. Rioja Alavesa also has Megalithic sites and monuments. The land neighbouring the Cantabrian Mountains conceals one of the largest concentrations of dolmens in the Basque Country. Proof of this is the narrow spine which starts off near Meano, in the East, and which weaves its way up to Leza, several kilometres to the west. These are the monolithic monuments of El Sotillo, San Martín, Los Llanos and la Chabola de la Hechicera. At the other end, near to Labastida, there is an important wine presses site on which the coveted grape was tread. There are multiple medieval villages in the region. Laguardia is the entire region's figurehead, the starting point of what is known as the wine route, which brings together the historical and cultural legacy of the region and everything related to the world of wine. Other villages which are tourist attractions are Peñacerrada, Labraza, Labastida, Elvillar, Samaniego and Elciego.

=== Nature ===
==== Natural areas ====
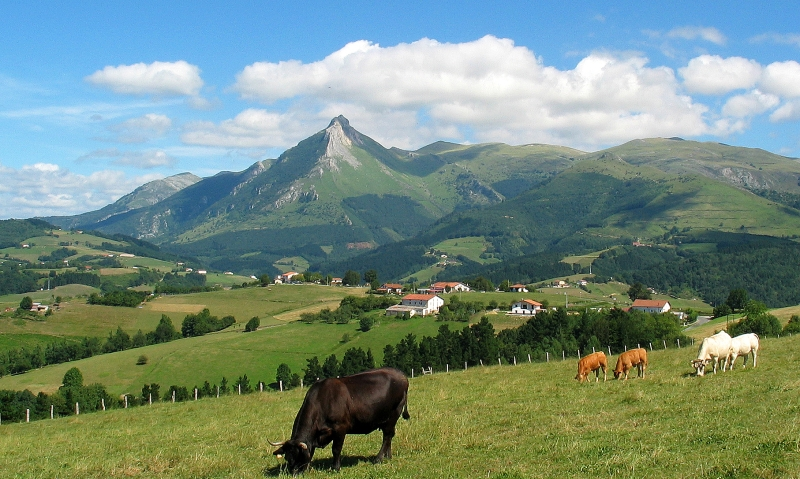
Txindoki Mountain

The approximate 7,200 km^{2} area of the Basque Autonomous Community is basically home to two types of landscape: a coastline which is green, humid and mountainous (which is the location of the regions of Biscay, Gipuzkoa and the Alavese Mountain), and the vast and dry southern plains of Álava. Between both of these extremes, the Alavese Plain acts as a transition zone. There are 19 natural areas of different categories, spread out across the entire Autonomous Community, and they can all be visited. Ten of them have the status of National Parks: Peñas de Aya National Park, Pagoeta and Aralar in Gipuzkoa; Izki, Valderejo and Entzia in Álava; Gorbea, and Urkiola in Álava and Biscay; Armañón in Biscay and Aizkorri in Gipuzkoa and Álava. Furthermore, there are six Protected Biotopes: Inurritza, Leizaran and the abrasion platform (Flysch) in Gipuzkoa; Itxina and Gaztelugatxe in Biscay; and the Laguardia Lagoons in Álava. In this rural setting there are some of the most important religious monuments such as La Antigua Roman hermitage, in Zumarraga, the Sanctuary of Our Lady of Arantzazu, the patron saint of Gipuzkoa, or the basilica of Saint Ignatius of Loyola. Many museums present traditional Basque culture, such as the Sagardoetxea (Cider Museum) or the Cider House in Astigarraga (Gipuzkoa), the ironworks of Agorregui (Gipuzkoa) and El Pobal (Biscay), the Elosu Museum of Basque Pottery (Álava)...

==== Active tourism ====
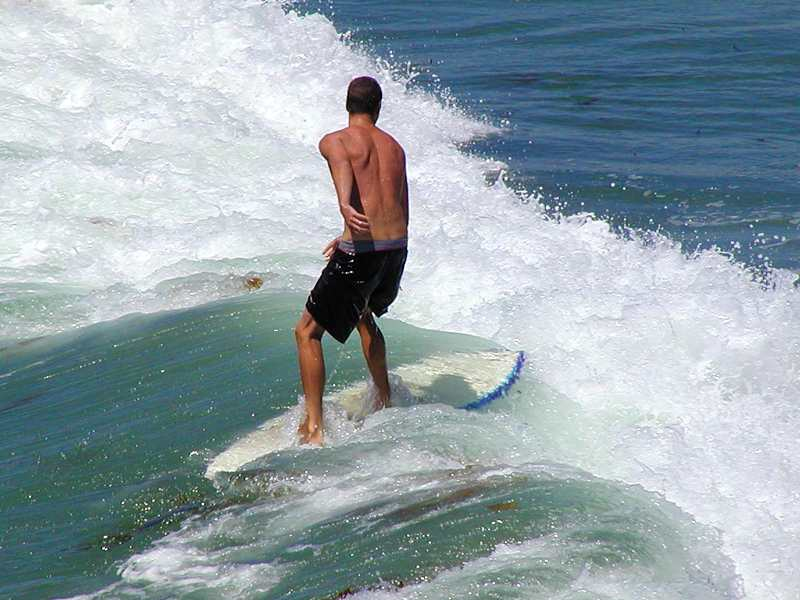
Surf in the Basque Autonomous Community.

The Basque Country has a wide selection of active tourism companies and all types of adventure sport businesses, from the most technical and specialised to the more common forms such as surfing, mountain biking, hiking and bird watching. There are thirteen Long-Distance - or GR – footpaths, signposted and marked out with red and white marks, which make it possible to cross the Autonomous Community in all directions, discovering the frontiers of Gipuzkoa (GR 121), the Alavese Plain through the route along the side of the mountains (GR 25) or the Urdaibai biosphere reserve through GR 98. There are also Short-Distance - or PR – footpaths, signposted with white and yellow stripes, which allow shorter routes which are accessible to the general public, but with a similar theme. Cycling enthusiasts have 130 kilometres of Greenways which have been opened up, nine roads recovered from old railway lines which had fallen into disuse. Examples include the Plazaola Greenway, which crosses the valley of the River Leizaran, the old Basque-Navarre railway line, The Zadorra Greenway, between the Álava reservoirs, or the Arrazola Greenway, in the surrounding area of Mount Anboto.

=== Basque coast ===
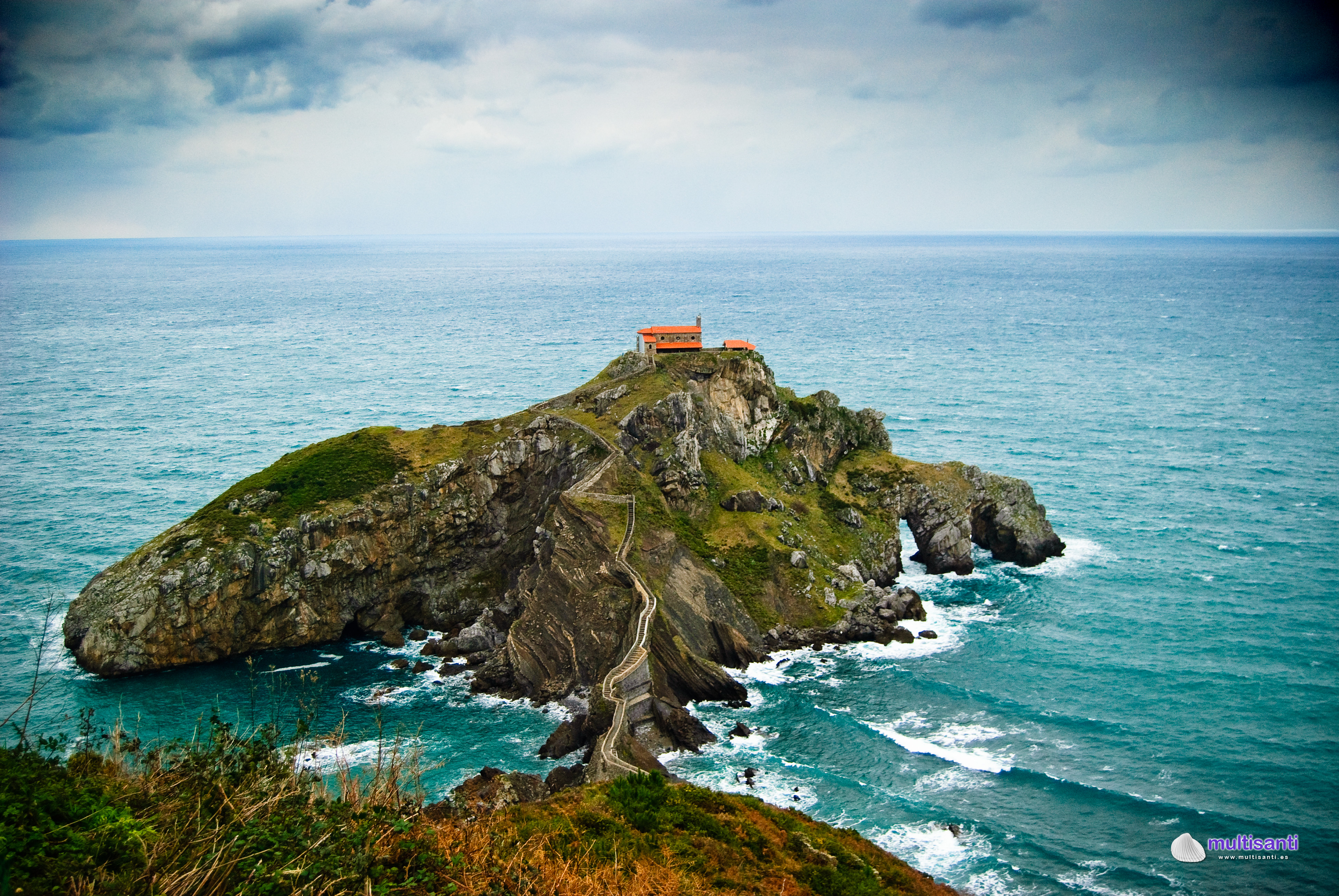
Gaztelugatxe

The Basque coast comprises more than 250 kilometres of beaches, sandy areas, islands, rias, marshes, cliffs, fishing villages and rock formations (flysch) which are unique in the world. The Basque coast connects villages which have economies which are still strongly linked to the sea, such as Bermeo, Ondarroa and Getaria, with other towns which are traditionally tourist attractions such as Zarautz, Lekeitio and Mundaka. One of the symbols of the maritime Biscay is Gaztelugatxe, an island which is crowned by a hermitage and linked to land by a path with steps. Located on the coastline near to the estuary of the Ria of Urdaibai, a natural area which has been declared a biosphere reserve. In Gipuzkoa, it is worth highlighting Zarautz beach, one of the biggest and most popular among surfers, much like the beach of Mundaka in Biscay. Zumaia and its abrasion platform (Flysch), and the wetlands of Plaiaundi, in Hondarribia. In addition to this there are the recently created modern marinas such as Hondarribia, Orio and Getxo. To explore the culture and history associated with the sea, there are numerous models and objects in the Bilbao Maritime Museum, the Fisherman's Museum and the Naval Museum in San Sebastián, among others. Furthermore, San Sebastián Aquarium is famous for its eye-catching oceanarium through which a Perspex tube passes which is home to a wide range of species from the Cantabrian Sea. The Camino de Santiago (214.2 km) travels along the entire Basque coast and it is one of the oldest pilgrim routes. The route begins in the port of Hondarribia (Gipuzkoa), recalling the steps of the first pilgrims who arrived by sea.

=== Business tourism ===
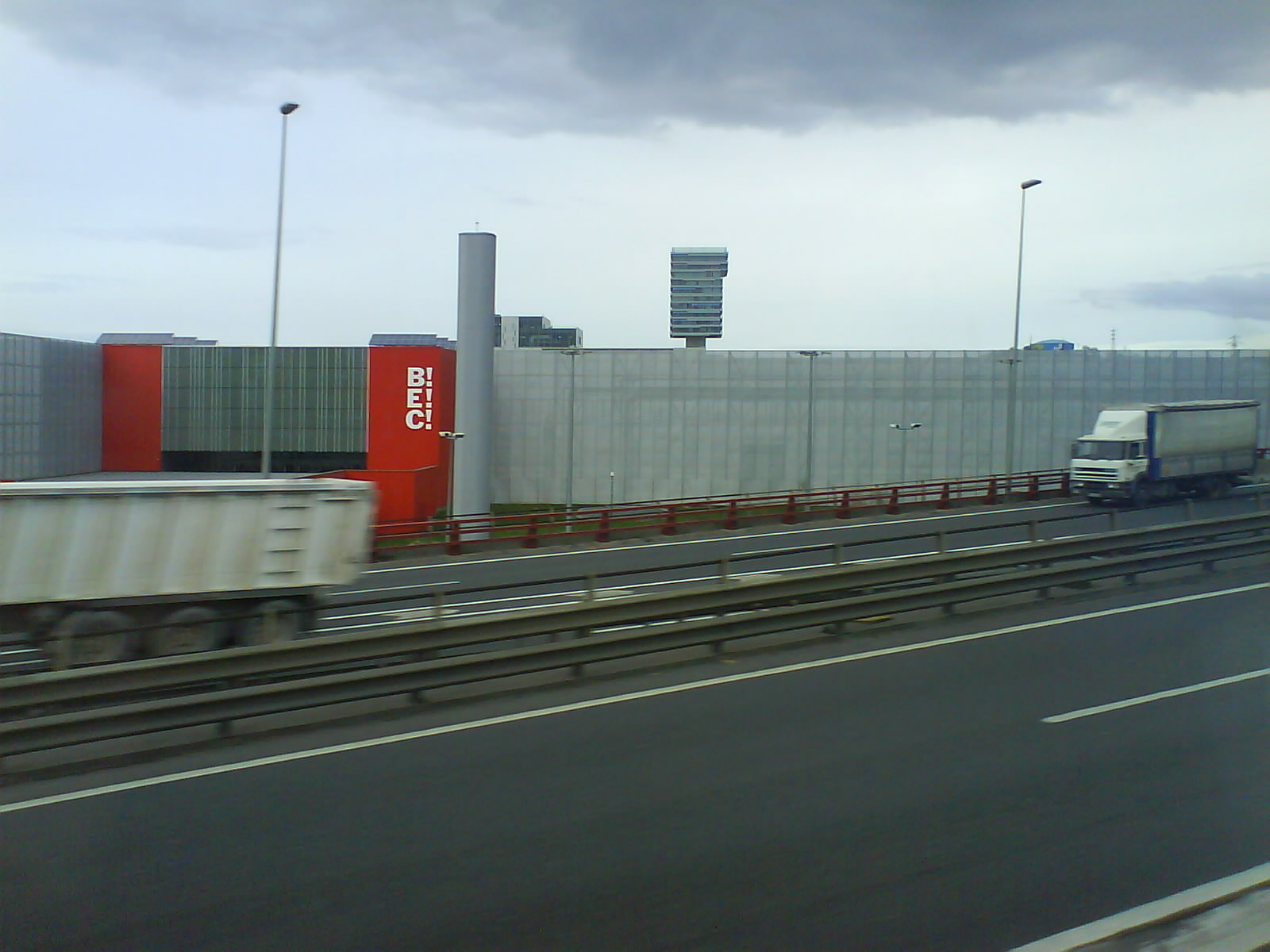
Bilbao Exhibition Center

San Sebastián, Vitoria-Gasteiz and Bilbao have much experience in the area of conferences, meetings, conventions and incentives. All three have Convention Bureaux, which facilitate the organisation of events. The three capitals have opted for stylish sites, from which it is worth highlighting the Kursaal Congress Centre (San Sebastián), designed by Rafael Moneo, the Europa Congress Centre (Vitoria-Gasteiz) and the Euskalduna Conference Centre (Bilbao), which has the appearance of a ship which is continuously under construction. There are a further dozen sites on offer with different shapes and sizes for all types of gatherings, such as Ficoba, in Irun. Bilbao is also home to the Bilbao Exhibition Centre, a large, versatile space for every type of event.

=== Events ===
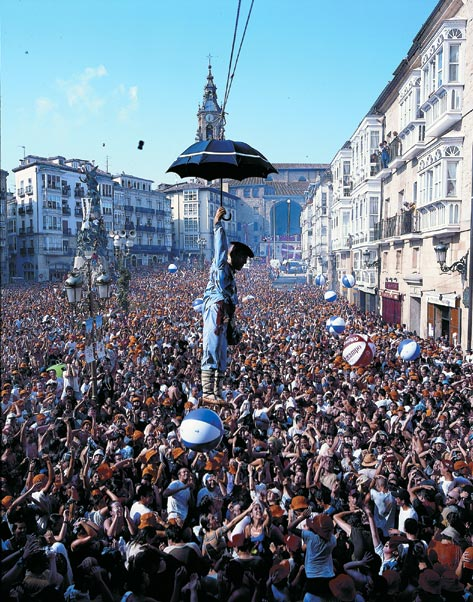
Vitoria-Gasteiz party

The community's cultural agenda is extensive and diverse, bringing together top notch cultural and festive events involving all styles of music, theatre, dance, comics and cinema. In San Sebastián, the most famous event is the San Sebastian International Film Festival, which is held in September. Hundreds of films have been presented there, and it has been visited by movie stars such as Lauren Bacall, Alfred Hitchcock, Robert Mitchum and Woody Allen. The International Jazz Festival, which takes place in July, and the Quincena Musical, which is held in August, are the two other best known competitions in the capital of Gipuzkoa. It is also worth highlighting the Big Week of San Sebastián in August, where fireworks are used in celebration. In Bilbao, music takes on special importance in the summer, with rock festivals such as the BBK Live Festival or the Azkena Rock Festival, which attract the very best artists. It is also worth mentioning the traditional Opera season of the A.B.A.O. (Bilbao Association of Friends of Opera), the Biscay Choir Week and the concerts by the Symphonic Orchestra of Bilbao throughout the year. Film buffs gather in May in the Horror and Fantasy Film Festival and in November in the International Festival of Documentary and Short Films. There is also a special place for the famous Big Week of Bilbao which is always held in August, with countless activities and shows. In Vitoria-Gasteiz one of the most important cultural events is the International Theatre Festival which lasts from October to November, and the International Jazz Festival. Another notable event in the capital of Álava is the Festival of the White Virgin, which is held at the beginning of August and for which the entire city comes out to celebrate.
