= Ranked lists of Spanish autonomous communities =

This article includes several ranked indicators for Spain's 17 autonomous communities, as well as for the autonomous cities of Ceuta and Melilla.

== Population and geography ==
Autonomous community/city	Population (2025)	Area (km^{2})	Density (inh./km^{2})	Coastline length (km)
Andalusia	8,676,713	87,598.86	99.1	945
Aragon	1,364,621	47,739.65	28.6	0
Asturias	1,015,128	10,605.70	95.7	401
Balearic Islands	1,249,844	4,991.70	250.4	1,428
Basque Country	2,242,343	7,234.27	310.0	246
Canary Islands	2,258,866	7,445.58	303.4	1,583
Cantabria	593,623	5,330.20	111.4	284
Castile and León	2,401,221	94,216.91	25.5	0
Castile-La Mancha	2,126,378	79,447.44	26.8	0
Catalonia	8,124,126	32,112.65	253.0	699
Ceuta	83,567	19.87	4,205.7	26
Extremadura	1,053,345	41,633.60	25.3	0
Galicia	2,714,741	29,583.91	91.8	1,498
La Rioja	326,803	5,045.09	64.8	0
Community of Madrid	7,113,886	8,027.47	886.2	0
Melilla	87,067	14.24	6,114.3	12
Region of Murcia	1,586,989	11,316.17	140.2	274
Navarre	683,854	10,392.16	65.8	0
Valencian Community	5,425,182	23,265.23	233.2	518

== Average income ==
Annual median per-capita income by Spanish province, 2021: €20.000-€21.000; €19.000-€20.000; €18.000-€19.000; €17.000-€18.000; €16.000-€17.000; €15.000-€16.000; €14.000-€15.000; €13.000-€14.000; €12.000-€13.000; €11.000-€12.000

The following table shows the difference in average income for each of the 17 autonomous communities of Spain. The data was provided by the INE.

#	Autonomous community	Average income (€) 2023
1	Community of Madrid	42,198
2	Basque Country	40,600
3	Navarre	37,088
4	Catalonia	35,325
5	Aragon	34,658
6	Balearic Islands	34,381
7	La Rioja	32,828
8	Castile and León	29,698
9	Galicia	28,644
10	Cantabria	28,461
11	Asturias	28,130
12	Valencian Community	26,453
13	Region of Murcia	25,887
14	Castilla-La Mancha	25,758
15	Canary Islands	24,345
16	Extremadura	23,604
17	Andalusia	23,218
Spain		32,630

== GDP ==
The list below shows all of the autonomous communities and two autonomous cities of Spain. The list shown is from 2023 (provisional data) and is in euros. The nominal GDP in Spain in 2023 was 1.5 trillion euros.

Autonomous community	GDP in billions (2023) €	Share of GDP
Andalusia	199.9	13.3%
Aragon	46.7	3.1%
Asturias	28.3	1.9%
Balearic Islands	42.1	2.8%
Basque Country	87.9	5.9%
Canary Islands	54.2	3.6%
Cantabria	16.8	1.1%
Castile and León	70.9	4.7%
Castilla–La Mancha	53.9	3.6%
Catalonia	281.8	18.8%
Extremadura	24.9	1.7%
Galicia	77.4	5.2%
Madrid	293.0	19.6%
Murcia	40.4	2.7%
Navarre	25.0	1.7%
La Rioja	10.6	0.7%
Valencian Community	139.4	9.3%
Ceuta	1.9	0.1%
Melilla	1.8	0.1%

=== GDP per capita ===
#	Autonomous community	GDP per capita in €	Year
-	European Union	37,610	2023
-	Spain	30,968	2023
1	Madrid	42,198	2023
2	Basque Country	39,547	2023
3	Navarre	37,088	2023
4	Catalonia	35,325	2023
5	Aragon	34,658	2023
6	Balearic Islands	34,381	2023
7	La Rioja	32,828	2023
8	Castile and León	29,698	2023
9	Galicia	28,644	2023
10	Cantabria	28,461	2023
11	Asturias	28,130	2023
12	Valencian Community	26,453	2023
13	Murcia	25,887	2023
14	Castilla–La Mancha	25,758	2023
15	Canary Islands	24,345	2023
16	Extremadura	23,604	2023
17	Andalusia	23,218	2023
18	Ceuta	22,751	2023
19	Melilla	20,479	2023

== Human Development Index ==
Map of the Spanish autonomous communities by Human Development Index in 2017. Legend: > 0.910 0.890 – 0.910 0.870 – 0.890 0.860 – 0.870 < 0.860

This is a list of Spain's 17 autonomous communities and the 2 autonomous cities of Ceuta and Melilla by their Human Development Index with data for the year 2023.

#	Autonomous community	HDI (2023)
-	Very high human development	
1	Madrid	0.951
2	Basque Country	0.947
3	Navarre	0.936
4	Catalonia	0.929
5	La Rioja	0.924
6	Aragon	0.923
7	Castile and León	0.920
-	Spain (average)	0.918
8	Cantabria	0.918
9	Galicia	0.917
10	Asturias	0.914
11	Valencian Community	0.905
12	Region of Murcia	0.893
13	Andalusia	0.889
14	Balearic Islands	0.887
15	Canary Islands	0.884
16	Castilla–La Mancha	0.884
17	Extremadura	0.884
18	Melilla	0.874
19	Ceuta	0.868

== See also ==
- Ranked lists of Spanish provinces
- Ranked lists of Spanish municipalities
- List of countries by Human Development Index
