= Tolosa =

Tolosa may refer to:

== Places ==
- Tolosa, the name of Toulouse, France, in Occitan (endonymic), Basque, Catalan, Spanish, Portuguese, Italian and Latin
- Tolosa, Buenos Aires, a neighborhood of La Plata, Buenos Aires province, Argentina
- Tolosa, Leyte, a municipality in the Philippines
- Tolosa, Portugal, a parish of Nisa, Portugal
- Tolosa, Gipuzkoa, a town and municipality in Basque Country, Spain
- Tolosa, Texas, an unincorporated community in Kaufman County, United States
- Cerro Tolosa, a mountain in Argentina
- Visigothic Kingdom of Tolosa, a kingdom in southwestern France and the Iberian Peninsula (418-507 A.D.)

== People ==
- Ambesse Tolosa (born 1977), Ethiopian long-distance runner who specializes in the marathon
- Eugenio Tolosa, a 19th-century brigadier general in the Mexican army, see timeline of the Texas Revolution
- Joyos de Tolosa (probably 13th century), troubadour from Toulouse
- Juan de Tolosa (fl. 16th century), Spanish Basque conquistador
- Juan Carlos Tolosa (born 1966), Argentine composer, pianist and conductor
- Peire Guillem de Tolosa, 13th-century troubadour from Toulouse
- Peire Raimon de Tolosa (fl. 12th-century–13th-century), troubadour from Toulouse
- Rafael Tolosa (1958–2026), Colombian racing cyclist
- Ramón Tolosa (1960–2025), Colombian road cyclist
- Victoria Tolosa Paz (born 1973), Argentine politician

== Other ==
- 138 Tolosa, an asteroid
- SS Tolosa a number of ships with this name
- Tolosa mountain, a 5432 m high peak in the Andes next to the Aconcagua

== See also ==
- Tolosa–Hunt syndrome, a rare medical disorder
- Gold of Tolosa, a hoard of "cursed" treasures pillaged from Greece and left in the Tolosa lakes
