= SS Tolosa =

A number of steamships were named Tolosa, including

- SS Tolosa (1908), a Norwegian cargo ship in service 1916–27
- SS Tolosa (1920), an American Design 1019 cargo ship in service 1920–40
- SS Tolosa (1930), a Norwegian cargo ship in service 1930–44
