= Arteche Group =

Spanish multinational technology company

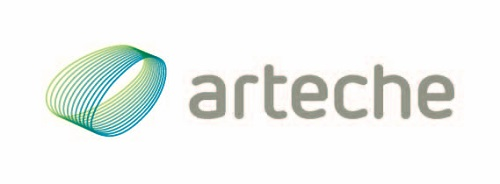
- Native name: Arteche
- Founded: 1946
- Founder: Aurelio de Arteche
- Headquarters: Mungia, Spain
- Area served: Worldwide
- Website: http://www.arteche.com/en

Arteche is a Spanish multinational corporation headquartered in Mungia, Spain. Arteche develops equipment for the electric power industry, including generation, transmission, and distribution.

The company employs almost 2,400 people on 4 continents (2014). Arteche equipment is installed in more than 150 countries.

Arteche divides its operations into three business units: instrument transformers, power grids, and turnkey solutions.

== History ==
=== First years ===
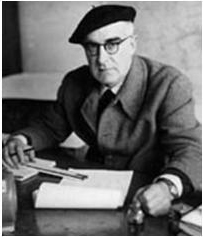
Mr. Aurelio Arteche, December 1946.

After nine years in exile due to the Spanish Civil War and the Second World War, Aurelio de Arteche y Arana (1908–1983) returned to Bilbao, his hometown, in 1946 to accomplish his main life objective: creating a company like Usines Balteau, S.A., a company he knew during his exile in Belgium.

Thanks to help from friends, family and Marcel Balteau, Aurelio founded EAHSA, Electrotecnica Arteche Hermanos, S.A., in December 1946.

EAHSA manufactured Balteau's Instrument Transformers for the Spanish and Portuguese markets.

=== 1954 to 1974 ===
1954-74 was a period of stronger growth for Arteche. Manufacturing Balteau's Instrument Transformers and ICE-Paris's Auxiliary Relays. The company grew over 22,8% per year.

During these years, Arteche expanded in the national market, becoming a benchmark for the Spanish power industry.

Aurelio decided that producing under license presented major disadvantages, primarily inability to develop its own technology, and inability to export to other markets.

=== 1974 to 1995 ===
In 1973, Arteche ended its relationship with Usines Balteau, S.A. and with ICE-Paris.

The company sought the ability to export beyond the Iberian Peninsula, objected the grant of a license to a rival Portuguese company, and Usines Balteau's refusal to create a common technology center. The separation from ICE-Paris was triggered by frequent supply problems.

However, the main reason was Arteche's desire to internationalize and develop its own products.

During this period growth shrank to 1,5% per year. A substantial portion of the company resources were devoted to the development of new products and to open new markets.

Arteche completed several milestones during this period, such as the production of its own Auxiliary Relays (1976), Instrument Transformers up to 765 kV (1981) and Electronic Instrument Transformers (1990). During these years, Arteche had its first sales in South America (1976) and North America (1993).

=== 1995- ===
Arteche entered Asia (2004) and Oceania (2010), while adding products include Voltage Transformers for GIS substations and Optical Current Transformers (2010).

In 2012 Arteche changes its visual identity, adapting its logotype. The new logo is based upon a fractal, a succession of almost parallel lines, a structure that repeats itself at different levels, with Arteche's colours in gradients.

== Activities ==
=== Business units ===
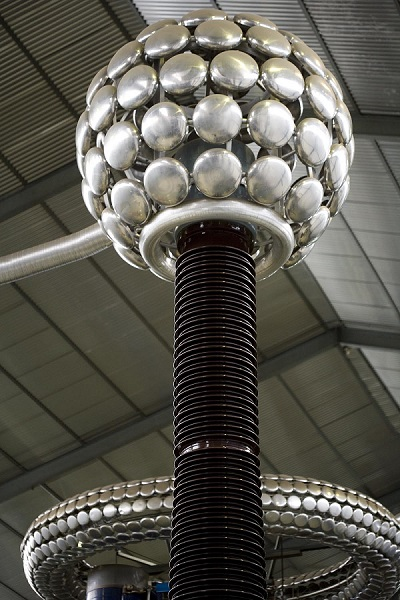
Arteche's Ultra High Voltage Laboratory

Arteche has nearly 2,400 employees in four continents, with equipment installed in more than 150 countries. The company is organized in three business units:

- Instrument Transformers: first independent instrument transformer manufacturer with presence in Europe, North and South America, Asia and Oceania.
- Power Grid: manufacturer and developer of primary equipment to improve transmission and distribution management, power generation and industrial power systems, with auxiliary relays for critical applications, power quality, switchgear, automation distribution, protection and measurement. The unit operates in Europe, North and South America, Middle East and Asia.

=== Research and development ===
R&D+I activities in Arteche Group have trended upwards, from less than 2,5% to more than 3,3% in 2014.

Arteche has the largest ultra high voltage laboratory in Spain, one of Europe's largest, which allow the company to test Instrument Transformers over 1.200kV.

== Group companies ==
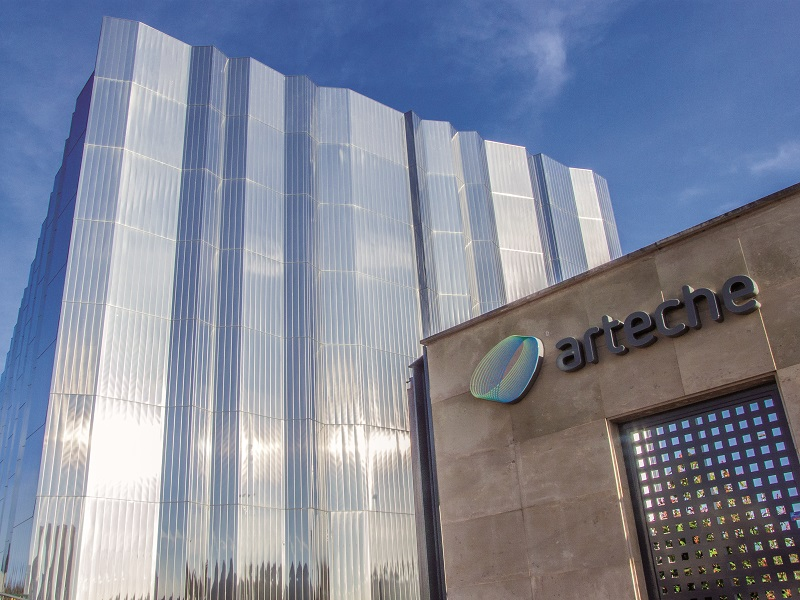
Arteche's headquarters

Arteche Group is structured into subsidiary companies in Europe, America, Asia and Oceania.

European companies are located in Spain, in the cities of Mungia, Vitoria or Madrid. Arteche has companies in Argentina, Chile, Brazil, Mexico, US, India, China and UAE.
