= British Symphony Orchestra discography =

This discography is an incomplete, chronological list of recordings commercially released with the name British Symphony Orchestra on the label. The list also includes other known recordings which fall outside this strict definition: either because they have been included in published discographies of specific conductors (e.g. Walter, Weingartner) under this name; or have been re-released as such on CD; or were never publicly released for general sale; or for comparison purposes only.

There seem to have been up to seven different separate incarnations of an orchestra of this name dating back to c1905, although there seems to be no documentary evidence that they were connected in any way. Some of the ensembles appear to have given public concerts only, and some to have only made studio recordings. These various orchestras are discussed in the British Symphony Orchestra article.

The discography is arranged into three main sections:

- The acoustic recordings made in the 1920s with His Master's Voice in Hayes, W. London and at Edison Bell in Peckham, SE London.
- The electrical recordings made by Columbia in the early 1930s in the Methodist Central Hall, Westminster.
- Modern digital recordings.

== Background ==
=== Acoustic recordings ===
Raymond Rôze recorded four sides with the orchestra he founded, for Edison Bell's Velvet Face label in c. 1919-early 1920. (Note: Edison Bell's main factory was located at Glengall Wharf on Glengall Rd, Peckham, by the Grand Surrey Canal (now filled in). The Peckham Branch of the canal terminated at Peckham Basin (also now filled in) beside the A202 Peckham Road near Rye Lane. The arresting Peckham Library stands on the old site. By 1924 Edison Bell had acquired some ten other premises in Peckham and Camberwell, and two in Huntingdon.)

Adrian Boult made the His Master's Voice recordings at Room 1, His Master's Voice, Hayes, Middlesex in 1920–1922, and the Velvet Face ones at the Edison Bell studio in Peckham, SW London, in 1923. He became chief conductor of the Birmingham Choir in late 1923, of the Birmingham Symphony Orchestra in 1924, music director of the BBC on 1 January 1930, and—from around October that year—concurrently the first chief conductor of the BBC Symphony Orchestra.

=== Electrical recordings ===
"Lasciate ogni speranza, voi ch'entrate."

In the early 1930s the Columbia Graphophone Company made a number of recordings, released with "British Symphony Orchestra" on the label. They were made in 1930–1932, mostly in the Methodist Central Hall, Westminster, which was built in 1911 and first used for recording by Columbia in January 1927. (Note: The first recording was of the BBC Wireless Symphony Orchestra, followed (among others) by a Beecham Messiah in June 1927; Brahms 1 and Mozart 39 with Weingartner and the "RPO" on 12 April 1928; an unissued Mozart 34 with Beecham with an unspecified orch on 8 July 1928, etc.) Columbia had been making recordings since 1924 with the orchestra of the Royal Philharmonic Society whose shadowy, occasional existence seems to be partially intertwined with that of the "British Symphony Orchestra" of this period, and is discussed here first.

==== Orchestra of the Royal Philharmonic Society ====
Since at least the beginning of the 20th century, the orchestra of the Royal Philharmonic Society was a somewhat ad hoc gathering of musicians which was engaged about once a month for an RPS concert under various conductors; from 1924 it also made a few recordings a year, again under different conductors. For recording purposes it was billed as "The Royal Philharmonic Orchestra" on Columbia record labels. The orchestra of this period is sometimes thus—by extension—often referred to as "the RPO" or "the old RPO". (Note: This occasional ensemble from the 1920s and '30s is not to be confused with the permanent Royal Philharmonic Orchestra, which was established (again by Beecham) in 1947.)

The members, described a "kind of test match team" were hand-picked from the orchestral musicians of London. The players booked for an RPS concert by the Hon. Sec. were expected to attend all rehearsals and the concert (or recording). The § deputy system was at first specifically disallowed, although this rule came to be severely flouted.

From 1916 Sir Thomas Beecham had effectively taken over the running of the Royal Philharmonic Society, which financially was on its last legs, and ran it autocratically until his resignation two years later in 1918. Balfour Gardiner stepped in with a guarantee of £1,200 to allow concerts to continue. The Society was incorporated in 1922 as a "company limited by guarantee and not having a share capital", which allowed it to enter into a recording contract with Columbia for five years in late 1923.

The Columbia Graphophone Company (Columbia UK) made over 40 recordings of the orchestra. Bruno Walter made numerous records with the orchestra from 1924: other conductors included Sir George Henschel, Paul von Klenau and Beecham, Oskar Fried (Tchaikovsky's 6th symphony in 1929) and Felix Weingartner. Venues included the Petty France studios; the Portman Rooms, Baker Street; (Note: Beecham with a revelatory Mozart Symphony No. 34, plus Harriet Cohen playing Bach Preludes & Fugues.) the marble-lined Scala Theatre, Charlotte Street; and, from 1930, Central Hall, Westminster. (Note: Walter seems not to have made any records with the orchestra under its own name after 1929, and its last named appearance on record labels appears to be Weingartner conducting his own arrangement of Beethoven's "Hammerklavier" Sonata and Josef Strauss's Sphärenklänge-Walzer, recorded in March–April 1930 just a month before Smyth recorded the "British Symphony Orchestra" in her The Wreckers overture (see below).)

A number of players joined the newly-formed BBC Symphony Orchestra in 1930. The orchestra of the Royal Philharmonic Society was reformed in autumn 1932 as the London Philharmonic Orchestra (LPO), as a permanent ensemble under Beecham and Malcolm Sargent with backing from the Courtauld family. A number of players were also lured away from the LSO, through what the LSO Board regarded as "treachery by Beecham and disloyalty by Sargent." Beecham conducted the LPO's first concert at the Queen's Hall on 7 October 1932 (Carnaval Romain, Brigg Fair, the 'Prague' symphony and Ein Heldenleben) to tumultuous applause.

===== Deputy system =====
The standard of orchestral playing in London had been seriously affected for many years by the deputy system, by which orchestral players—if offered a better-paid engagement—could send a substitute to a rehearsal or a concert. When Wood banned the practice in the Queen's Hall orchestra in 1904, forty disgruntled players left en masse to found the LSO. The Honorary Secretary of the Royal Philharmonic Society, John Mewburn Levien, described it thus: "A, whom you want, signs to play at your concert. He sends B (whom you don't mind) to the first rehearsal. B, without your knowledge or consent, sends C to the second rehearsal. Not being able to play at the concert, C sends D, whom you would have paid five shillings to stay away."

By the 1930s the standard of orchestral playing at Society concerts had fallen so much that "it had become a commonplace that "not one in twenty concerts were properly prepared", and critics and audiences were accustomed to making allowances". The frequent changes of players meant that only "a few celebrated batons, except Beecham's, and possibly Wood's were a regular match for prevailing conditions in the orchestra." Artur Schnabel was so unhappy about a performance of Mozart's A Major concerto K488 which he had given at a Royal Philharmonic Society concert with Basil Cameron that he wrote to The Times on 18 Jan 1930 to explain that the concert had been inadequately rehearsed. Walter J. Turner, the music critic of the New Statesman (25 January 1930) commented that the orchestra were "tired and apathetic", and that Schnabel's gesture to pay for an extra 30 minutes' rehearsal had to be refused since the extensive use of deputies reduced it to a meaningless gesture.

==== "British Symphony Orchestra" ====
"Quot homines, tot sententiae."

From 1930 to 1932, Columbia released fifteen recordings mostly made in the Central Hall with the name "British Symphony Orchestra" on the label: one each conducted by Smyth and Fried; three each by Wood and Weingartner; and seven by Walter. In addition Weingartner recorded Beethoven's 5th symphony with an unnamed ensemble, released in the US only as performed by a "Symphony Orchestra". It has been re-released on CD as being by the "British Symphony Orchestra", but the basis for this is flimsy to non-existent.

The first recording with "British Symphony Orchestra" on the label was of Ethel Smyth conducting the overture to her opera The Wreckers. Her connection with a BSO may appear valid, since Raymond Rôze had promoted The Wreckers during his "Opera in English" season in 1909. when the very first BSO under William Sewell was giving concerts in London. In 1919 Rôze had formed the second British Symphony Orchestra, which existed as a semi-permanent ensemble until 1923.

The other conductor with perhaps a vague contemporary connection to the earlier BSO formations is Sir Henry Wood, who would have certainly have come across them in the 'old days': but he doesn't appear to have conducted the old orchestra when William Sewell, Harty, or Boult were giving concerts with the BSO. Hamilton Harty conducted concerts with the BSO in 1906 at the Queen's Hall, where Wood conducted his own New Queen's Hall Orchestra. His association with this later "British Symphony Orchestra" may have been somewhat tongue-in-cheek.

===== Identity =====
Record producers, reviewers and discographers have puzzled over the identity of the named and unnamed ensembles. It seems fairly clear that it was not Adrian Boult's old orchestra, which hadn't given a concert since 1923. According to George Frow, "this must have been a general pseudonym, since the original name of British Symphony Orchestra was used in 1919 by Raymond Rôze, who founded an orchestra to give employment to soldiers returning from the Great War, but this worthy ambition petered out after a season or two, when it foundered through lack of support."

The London Symphony Orchestra had a contract with His Master's Voice, and the New Queen's Hall Orchestra was disbanded by Chappell & Co. in 1927, or by 1930. The BBC Symphony Orchestra (BBCSO) was in the process of being formed, and gave its first concert at Queen's Hall under Boult on 22 October 1930. There were few other major London-based permanent symphonic ensembles, although the Hallé made frequent trips to the capital from Manchester, and made recordings there with Hamilton Harty for Columbia.

One other sizeable orchestra was that of the Royal Philharmonic Society, which was essentially an ad hoc or pickup orchestra engaged by the Hon. Secretary of the Philharmonic Society for about eight concerts a year at Queen's Hall.

A partial clue may lie in the Weingartner recordings of 1931 which haven't received much scrutiny because of their lesser musical content. Although they state "British Symphony Orchestra" on the label, Michael Gray's data shows that it was the Orchestra of the Royal Philharmonic Society under a cover name.

More particularly, there seems to be little discographical basis for the "British Symphony Orchestra" which appears on CD reissues of the recording of Beethoven 5th Symphony with Weingartner in 1932. It was made by an unnamed orchestra at an undisclosed location. It wasn't even issued in Britain because of the faintness of the recording and the variable recording speeds throughout the work.

The very next day after Weingartner recorded Beethoven 5th, Columbia recorded the waltz from Naila by Delibes on an unissued matrix CAX 6358, with the Columbia Symphony named as the performer. This is not at all the first example of the Columbia Symphony Orchestra. (Note: Weingartner made six sides in New York with the soprano Lucille Marcel (the third of his five marriages) and the Columbia Symphony Orchestra in February 1913. Frank Bridge made a single (unissued) take of Grieg's Shepherd's Boy, op. 54 on [Mx] AX 268 on 14 December 1923. Previous matrix was Leff Pouishnoff playing Listz's La Campanella on the same date. The composer and conductor Robert Hood Bowers made around 15 recordings with the orchestra in September 1927. Then nothing until Howard Barlow's recordings in New York in 1938.)

The last recording released with "British Symphony Orchestra" on the label was made by Henry Wood on 16 October 1932, about one week after the LPO (the "old RPO") had given its first concert.

As George Frow commented in 1979: "At this distance it is becoming difficult to break through the defences of the pseudonyms without deep research, and there is a great deal that will one day be done by somebody, not only on early individual performers, singers and comedians in particular, but orchestras, as has been shown".

==== Summary ====
The painstaking work carried out by, for example, Robert Marsh on his Bruno Walter discography (Marsh 1964), and also by Michael Gray on the discographical data of record companies other than His Master's Voice (in this case, Columbia) and available on the CHARM database, tends to indicate that the term "British Symphony Orchestra" was little more than a cunning marketing ploy, and was used as a cover name for the orchestra of the Royal Philharmonic Society on at least a handful of recordings by Weingartner in 1931. Having a named ensemble rather a plain "Symphony Orchestra" on a record label or re-issue on CD can improve sales, since categorising things is a significant human activity.

"The British Symphony Orchestra" in this context appears to be simply a name used by Columbia for an ad hoc recording ensemble of musicians, or pickup orchestra, quite possibly the Royal Philharmonic Orchestra. Any connection with the old BSO from the 1920s appears tenuous at the very least and borders on improbability, although some of the musicians may have played in both. The British Symphony Orchestra appears to have led the same type of existence as the Columbia Symphony which made its first appearance in 1913.

== Notes on the discography ==
The discography and following table are based on Michael Gray's database compiled from Columbia's own contemporary session logs and matrix notes, available on CHARM. This information often differs from the record labels, particularly the name of the ensemble.

In the database, a "British Symphony Orchestra" is only specified in three or four recordings. The orchestra of the Royal Philharmonic Society, which recorded as "The Royal Philharmonic Orchestra", is specified in the Weingartner recordings of 1931, released with "British Symphony Orchestra" on the label. In all the other recordings a plain "Symphony Orchestra" is given (apart from Weingartner's Beethoven 5th Symphony, where no orchestra or recording venue is specified at all).

Some sources (Altena et al.) attribute the Walter recordings of 1930 to a British Symphony Orchestra, even though the labels state "Symphony Orchestra". There seems to be little basis for this, except that they were made in the same year as the Smyth and Fried recordings. The recordings of the first two Sibelius symphonies by Robert Kajanus have been included in the table for comparison only, as have the 1930 Weingartner discs of the "Hammerklavier" sonata and a Strauss waltz.

=== Notes on Michael Gray's database on CHARM ===
Search terms should be in all lower-case only. All matrix numbers always have a space (e.g. wax 248), and all catalogue (or label) numbers never have a space (e.g. dx266). Searching for e.g. dx 266 as a catalogue number will return 0 results.

A .csv file (viewable with e.g. MS Excel) is created for each search, but it's a bit tricky to open. The default file name is generated with a session id, e.g. ax_270.csv;jsessionid=7EF92BCD186E2F3B86A31B36C0EC6F7D.balancer5. When you save the file you must either remove the semicolon and everything after it, to leave just e.g. ax_270.csv, or add .csv at the very end of the filename, e.g. ax_270.csv;jsessionid=7EF92BCD186E2F3B86A31B36C0EC6F7D.balancer5.csv.

Each search session completely expires after a fairly short period of inactivity (around 30 minutes), including the contents of the .csv file, so the results unfortunately can't be incorporated in any permanent web link. You will have to make the searches for yourself. Dates are always returned in y-m-d format. Three typical results are given here. (Note that Ethel Smyth's name is misspelled in the database which, though generally accurate, has not been checked/ proofread).

CatNum: DX287
Date: 1930-05-01
Label: Columbia
Performer: British Symphony Orchestra
Composer: SMYTHE
Title: The wreckers - Overture
Issue_78_45: DX287
Num: WAX 5567
Conductor: Smythe, Ethel

Date: 1931-04-07
Venue: London, Central Hall, Westminster
Label: Columbia
Performer: Orchestra of the Royal Philharmonic Society
Composer: MOZART, Leopold
Title: Cassation in G major 'Toy Symphony'
Issue_78_45: DX311 LX45
Num: WAX 6046
Conductor: Weingartner, Felix

CatNum: 68078-D
Date: 1932-03-17
Label: Columbia
Composer: BEETHOVEN
Title: Symphony No. 5 in C minor, op. 67
Num: CAX 6348
Conductor: Weingartner, Felix

=== Columbia recordings, matrix and catalogue numbers ===
A full Columbia electrically recorded matrix number is typically given in this discography as e.g. [Mx] CAX 6048-2 On the record disc itself the initial "C" (or "W") is enclosed in a circle, ©AX. (Note: The circled-W logo was required by Western Electric as part of its 1925 licensing agreement with Columbia UK. The CAX matrices which appear on BSO recordings from 1932 indicate Columbia's own process developed by Alan Blumlein by late 1930. See also Columbia Graphophone Company § Early history.) The -2 at the end indicates it was the second 'take' of that side, although Columbia (unlike His Master's Voice) didn't specify the actual take number on the record. In some other discographies the takes are given in Roman numerals: e.g. WAX 6048-II. Matrix numbers are given in full where known. A sequence of matrix numbers (without take numbering) is shown as e.g. [Mx] WAX 6104/7. Catalogue (i.e. label) numbers are shown without spaces (as in Gray's database), e.g. His Master's Voice D521 or, as a sequence, Columbia (UK) LX144/5.

Having released a recording with a catalogue number, Columbia was in the infamous habit of issuing newer recordings with the same catalogue number a few years later, sometimes of completely different works, and/or composers & musicians. Thus two entirely different recordings may share the same label number, and matrix numbers are the key to identifying specific recordings. (Note: For example, Columbia released two recordings by Sir Henry Wood with the same catalogue number, L1994. The first was Wagner's Ride of the Valkyries, recorded at the Scala Theatre, Charlotte Street 13 May 1927, [Mx] WAX 2580/1. The second was Bach's "Air on a G String", recorded 10 June 1932 at an unknown location, [Mx] CAX 6441/2. Nevertheless, Altena, Reveyoso & Ryding 2010 eschew the use of matrix numbers, and therefore fall into the traps laid for them by the Columbia Graphophone Company eighty years previously.)

Sometimes information printed on the record label is at variance with the printed record catalogues (e.g. Wood's 1932 recording of two movements by Bach). The operations of Columbia in the UK and the US can lead to confusion. They used different catalogue numbers, and some recordings were only released in the US, e.g. Weingartner's Beethoven 5th symphony or Walter's Prometheus Overture (see below).

== Acoustic Recordings 1919–1923 ==
=== Raymond Rôze ===
- Mozart: Overtures to The Magic Flute (heavily abridged) and Le Nozze di Figaro. British Symphony Orchestra cond. Rôze.

c1919-20, Edison Bell Studios, Peckham. [Mx] X-1118/9. Velvet Face VF502. (Note: Released in November 1921 as part of the first issues of Edison Bell's new Velvet Face label. The recording engineer was Joe Batten, who built up a catalogue of classical records to compete with His Master's Voice and Columbia. NB. Rôze didn't record Sibelius Finlandia and Mendelssohn The Hebrides overture, VF 503, [Mx] X-1097, X-1011. This was the Royal Symphony Orchestra, not the BSO as per Thomas 2018) (Note: Some Audio files here: "Raymond Roze". Damian's 78s.)

- Nicolai: Overture to The Merry Wives of Windsor. British Symphony Orchestra cond. Rôze.

c1919-20, Edison Bell Studios, Peckham. [Mx] X-1120, X-1121-3. Velvet Face VF512.

=== Adrian Boult ===
His Master's Voice

Boult made a number of unissued takes with the BSO: these are listed along with the released recordings.

- Scarlatti-Tommasini: The Good-humoured Ladies. British Symphony Orchestra cond. Boult. (Note: This seems not to be the published suite of six movements, but 14 numbers (out of 19) from the full score, which Boult conducted for Diaghilev's Ballet Russe at the Empire, Leicester Square, October–December 1919. More information here on Boult's first recording, with a downloadable .flac file: "Orchestral". Jolyon.)

November 1920-July 1921 (3 sessions). Room 1, His Master's Voice, Hayes. His Master's Voice D521, D573.

D521. Side 1: Nos. III, X, I. Rec. 5 November 1920. [Mx] HO 4598-2af.

Side 2: Nos. VI, VII, VIII. Rec. 16 November 1920. [Mx] HO 4617-2af

D573. Side 3: Nos. XIII, XIV, XV, XVI. (Note: In this and the following number on side 4, the piano reduction sometimes bears a slight approximation to what is being heard.) Rec. 21 July 1921. [Mx] Cc 382-2.

Side 4: Nos. XX (Note: Cut from 122 to 126) XXI, XXII, (Note: 'Cat fugue', cut from 140 to 145) XXIII. Rec. 5 November 1920. [Mx] HO 4595-2af

- Butterworth: Rhapsody, A Shropshire Lad. British Symphony Orchestra cond. Boult. (Note: First recording of anything by Butterworth, who died in the war. The two had been personal friends at Oxford.)

16 November 1920, Room 1, His Master's Voice, Hayes. [Mx] HO 4618/9. His Master's Voice D520.

- Wagner: Siegfried Idyll. British Symphony Orchestra cond. Boult.

6 December 1920, Room 1, His Master's Voice, Hayes. [Mx] HO 4645-1af HO 4646 af.

- (unissued?) Holst: Two Songs Without Words, Op 22, No. 1 – Country Song. British Symphony Orchestra cond. Boult.

6 December 1920 [Mx] HO 4647 af, HO 4648 af.

- Rossini-Respighi: La Boutique fantasque (selection). British Symphony Orchestra cond. Boult.

2 June 1921, Room 1, His Master's Voice, Hayes. [Mx] Cc 210-1, Cc 211-3. His Master's Voice D572.

- Bliss: Rout. Stella Power (soprano), British Symphony Orchestra cond. Boult. (Note: In a conversation for Canadian radio, Boult recalled the recording session for Arthur Bliss's Rout: "Yes, the British Symphony Orchestra was really the beginnings of the English Chamber Orchestra, that sort of thing. (Note: The conversation with Boult was recorded in July 1966 when he was around 77 years old, and remembering events of 45 years before. He is probably referring to the London Chamber Orchestra, formed in 1921 by Anthony Bernard and still in existence in 2024.) It was an orchestra of about twelve to sixteen players and we had a great time. (Note: This was obviously the size of the reduced band assembled for the recording session. Boult had been conducting concerts with the BSO as a full symphony orchestra since at least October 1920.) Anne Thursfield was the singer, (Note: The label credits Stella Power as the vocalist; it was Anna Thursfield (1885-1945) who later recorded a different work by Bliss, Madam Noy.) and we had this terrible contact business where you made your record and if there was a blemish on it you had to do it all again. We had finally got a good one, and just as it finished the composer, who was sitting in the studio, shouted out, 'By Jove, you fellows, that's splendid!' I said they ought to sell it like that. But we had to do it all again.") (Note: See also "1903 - Then and now: some bass reflections" by Eugene Cruft in Recorded Sound, Journal of the British Institute of Recorded Sound, No. 42-43, April–July 1971. The Institute became the British Library Sound Archive.)

21 July 1921, Room 1, His Master's Voice, Hayes. [Mx] Cc 380-3, Cc 381-2. His Master's Voice D574.

- Humperdinck: Hansel and Gretel – Overture. British Symphony Orchestra cond. Boult.

3 November 1921, Room 1, His Master's Voice, Hayes. [Mx] Cc 624-2, 625-2. His Master's Voice D591.

- (unissued?) Holst: Two songs without words, Op. 22, No. 2 – Marching Song. British Symphony Orchestra cond. Boult.

3 November 1921, Room 1, His Master's Voice, Hayes. [Mx] Cc 626-1, Cc 626-2.

- (unissued?) Wagner: Siegfried Idyll. British Symphony Orchestra cond. Boult.

5 December 1921, Room 1, His Master's Voice, Hayes. [Mx] Cc 742-1/2, Cc 743-1/2, Cc 744-1/3 (7 takes).
3 February 1922, Room 1, His Master's Voice, Hayes. [Mx] Cc 742-3, Cc 742-4, Cc 744-5, Cc 974-1/3 (6 takes)
20 March 1922, Room 1, His Master's Voice, Hayes. [Mx] Cc 742-5/7, Cc 974-4/6 (6 takes)

- Humperdinck: Hansel and Gretel – "Hexentritt" & "Traum". British Symphony Orchestra cond. Boult.

6 March 1922, Room 1, His Master's Voice, Hayes. [Mx] Cc 1069-3, Cc 1070-2. His Master's Voice D617.

- (unissued?) Butterworth: Two English Idylls – No 1. British Symphony Orchestra cond. Boult.

20 March 1922, Room 1, His Master's Voice, Hayes. [Mx] Cc 1129-1.

Edison Bell Velvet Face

- Liszt: Piano Concerto No.1 in E flat. Anderson Tyrer (piano), British Symphony Orchestra cond. Boult. (Note: "Dr. Adrian Boult's first recording for Velvet Face was Liszt's E flat Piano Concerto, Anderson Tyrer being the soloist. Our well-concealed recording studio in Peckham was remote from the West End. The first session had been called for ten in the morning; since dawn it had rained hard and incessantly. Through this downpour Boult pedalled across London on a bicycle; when he arrived at the studio his clothes were soaked. But he made nothing of it, mounting the rostrum and getting to work without any fuss. As he conducted, water dripped from coat and trousers and collected in puddles about his feet. Despite this physical discomfort, he made a musicianly job of the Liszt work." (Batten 1956, p. 61), hosted at Grumpy's Classics Cave.)

c1922, Edison Bell Studios, Peckham. [Mx] X-1241, X-1242, X-1243, X-1244. Velvet Face VF557/8.

- Schubert: "Unfinished" Symphony. British Symphony Orchestra cond. Boult.

c1922, Edison Bell Studios, Peckham. [Mx] unknown. Velvet Face VF540/2.

VF540. 1st mvt, parts 1 & 2
VF541. 1st mvt, part 3, 2nd mvt, part 1
VF542. 2nd mvt, parts 2 & 3

- Offenbach: Orphee Aux Enfers, Overture. British Symphony Orchestra, conductor unknown.

c1922, Edison Bell Studios, Peckham. [Mx] X-1304/5. Velvet Face VF566.

- Franck: Symphonic Variations. Anderson Tyrer (piano). British Symphony Orchestra cond. Boult. (Note: Issued in November 1924, when it was reviewed in The Gramophone. The reviewer, Peter Latham, preferred Arthur De Greef's 1922 version with Ronald on His Master's Voice D 697-98.)

c1922, Edison Bell Studios, Peckham. [Mx] X-1398, X-1399, X-1400, X-1401. Velvet Face VF599-600.

- Tchaikovsky: The Nutcracker (excerpts). British Symphony Orchestra cond. Boult

February 1923, Edison Bell Studios, Peckham. [Mx] 7542/5. Velvet Face VF1060 & VF1062 (10").

VF1060. [Mx] 7542-1, 7544-1. 'Valse Des Fleurs'; "Danse Des Mirlitons"
VF1062. [Mx] 7543-1, 7545-1. 'March Of The Toys'; 'Danse Chinoise'; 'Danse Arabe'

== Electrical recordings 1930-1932 ==
Columbia released some fifteen recordings with "British Symphony Orchestra" on the label. A conductor's name in italics indicates that the immediately following recordings were not assigned to the British Symphony Orchestra by Columbia in any way. They are listed for comparison only. All the entries are listed in a sortable table following the main discography.

=== 1930 ===
Felix Weingartner

These are the last issued recordings of the "old" Royal Philharmonic Orchestra, the recording name of the orchestra of the Royal Philharmonic Society.

- Beethoven (orch. Weingartner): Hammerklavier Sonata, Op. 106. Orchestra of the RPS cond. Weingartner

26 March 1930, Central Hall, Westminster. [Mx] WAX 5485/92. Columbia (UK) LX43/7.

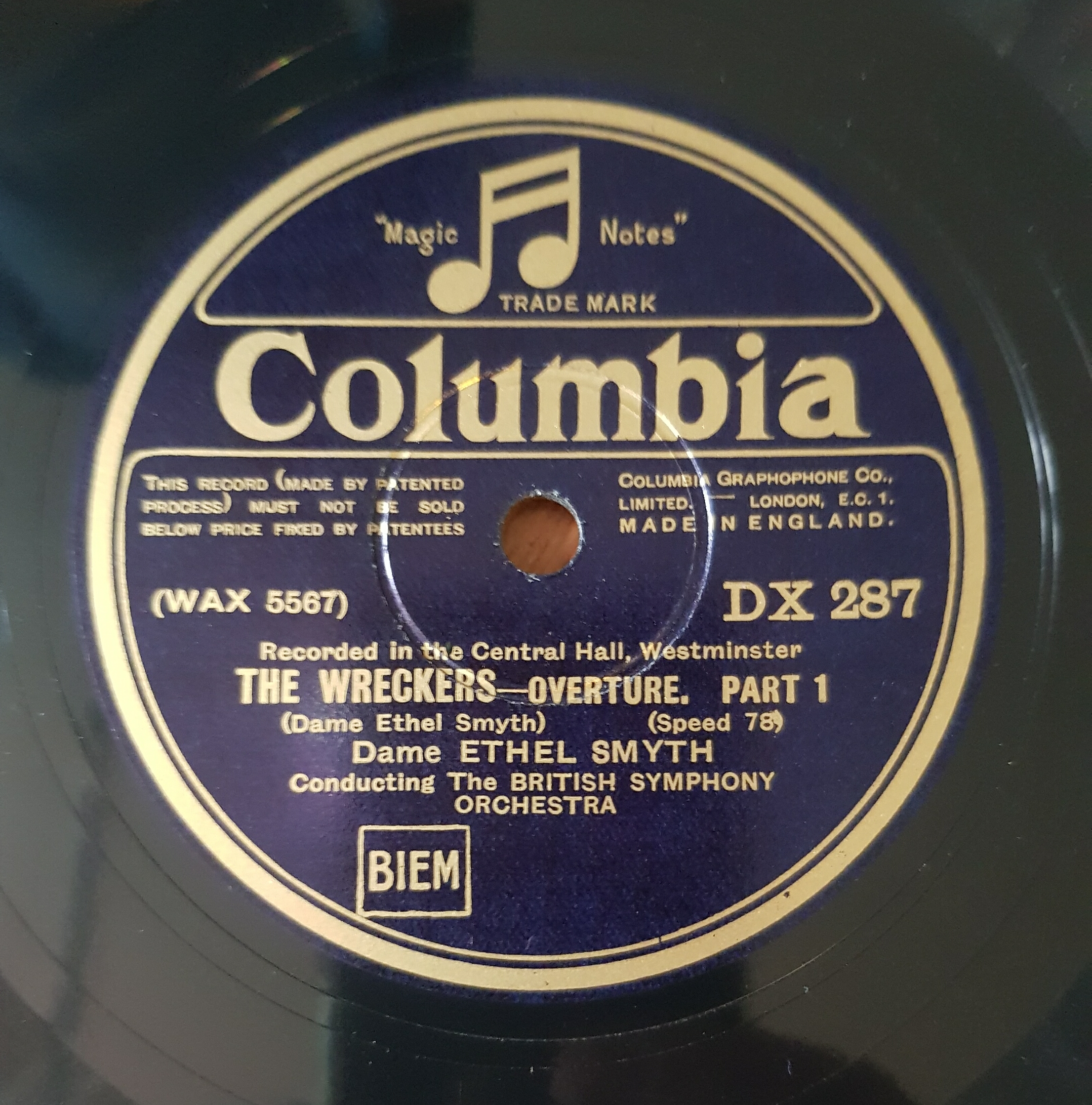
Ethel Smyth's recording of The Wreckers overture

- Josef Strauss: Sphärenklänge-Walzer, op. 235 (Music of the Spheres). Orchestra of the RPS cond. Weingartner.

1 April 1930, Central Hall, Westminster. [Mx] WAX 5500/1. Columbia (UK) LX40.

Ethel Smyth

- Smyth: The Wreckers Overture. British Symphony Orchestra, cond Smyth.

1 May 1930, Central Hall, Westminster. [Mx] WAX 5567/8. Columbia (UK) DX 287.

Bruno Walter

These three recordings were issued by Columbia with a plain "Symphony Orchestra" on the label. At least one source (Altena, Reveyoso & Ryding 2010) assigns the British Symphony Orchestra as the ensemble, although neither Columbia's own data nor the label back this up. (Note: Altena et al. also say that Walter recorded Mozart's Symphony No. 40 with the BSO, but this seems to confuse a 1929 set with the Berlin Staatskapelle on Columbia M 182, or DX 31-33 (UK). Walter also made some recordings in the Scala Theatre, London, in 1929, not to be confused with the Teatro alla Scala, Milan.)

- Wagner: Siegfried Idyll. "Symphony Orchestra", cond. Walter.

16 May 1930, Central Hall, Westminster. [Mx] WAX 5584/7
Columbia (US) "Masterworks" set X-26; Columbia (UK) LX 79/80. (Note: Marsh 1964 says "London pickup orchestra".)

- Wagner: Die Meistersinger von Nurnberg, Prelude to Act I. "Symphony Orchestra", cond. Walter.

16 May 1930, Central Hall, Westminster. [Mx] WAX 5588/9. Columbia (UK) DX86 (Note: DX86 had already been used for an earlier 1925 recording of the same work: Wagner: Meistersinger Prelude to Act III (abridged), Royal Philharmonic Orchestra cond. Walter, February 11, 1925, Petty France Studios.)

- Beethoven: Prometheus Overture, Op. 43. "Symphony Orchestra", cond. Walter.

16 May 1930, Central Hall, Westminster. [Mx] WAX 5590/1. Columbia (US) 68091-D. (Note: Marsh 1964 says "London pickup orchestra".) (Note: This is a blue wax disk in a "Viva-Tonal" pressing. Altena et al. assign it to Columbia (UK) LX277, but that is actually the Weingartner recording of the "Prometheus" Ov. on the last side of the Beethoven 4th Symphony set with the LPO, LX274-277. Clough & Cuming 1952, p. 58a say it was the British Symphony Orchestra, but was only available in the US.)

Robert Kajanus

Although none of these recordings by an unnamed "Symphony Orchestra" have been attributed to the British Symphony Orchestra, Mark Obert-Thorn puts forward the view that the ensemble was the orchestra of the Royal Philharmonic Society, "the old RPO". (Note: These 1930 recordings were sponsored by the Finnish Government for 50,000 marks (approx. £250 in 1930, perhaps £25,000 today). They were re-issued on LP SH.191/2 by World Records (previously World Record Club, taken over by EMI in 1973 and subsequently by His Master's Voice on the same catalogue number. In the 1973 sleeve notes, The well-known and distinguished record critic Robert Layton cites the correct name on the label, a plain "Symphony Orchestra". There is nothing at all in the Columbia press release dated 30 May 1930 (reprinted in the sleeve notes) to suggest that it was any named orchestra. Layton again, in Sibelius Studies (Layton 2001, p. 16) doesn't seem to mention the orchestra's name. (Note: Although the first page is missing from Google Books...) Hanna-Leena Paloposki (Paloposki 2017, p. 7 n35) (quoting Tawaststjerna 1988, 344–45; Vahtola 2008, 121) says: "The record contains the First and the Second Symphony and Finlandia. London musicians are conducted on Sibelius's recommendation by Robert Kajanus." Bethany Lowe (Lowe 2004, p. 223) says just "unnamed "Symphony Orchestra" formed from London-based players." Guy Thomas (Thomas 1990, pp. 33, 37, 41, & 64) also says just "SO". Tawaststjerna himself says that "The orchestra was drawn from the London Symphony, which could not be named for contractual reasons." Andrew Barnett (Barnett 2007, p. 333) also says that it was the LSO (billed simply as "Symphony Orchestra"). In his discography he doesn't even mention the orchestra's name. Tawaststjerna and Barnett may have been confused. The LSO actually recorded Mendelssohn's Hebrides Ov. (unissued), Franck's Le chasseur maudit and Chabrier's Joyeuse marche with Eugene Goossens on exactly the same dates as Kajanus' Sibelius recordings (21 & 23 May 1930) at the Kingsway Hall. Philip Stuart in his exhaustive LSO discography, partly based on Michael Gray's work, adds that the orchestra was billed as the "Royal Opera Orchestra".)

- Sibelius: Symphony No. 1. "Symphony Orchestra", cond. Kajanus

21–23 May 1930, Central Hall, Westminster [Mx] WYX 1/WYX 9. Columbia (UK) LX65/69.

- Sibelius: Symphony No. 2. "Symphony Orchestra", cond. Kajanus

27–28 May 1930, Central Hall, Westminster. [Mx] WYX 10/WYX 18. Columbia (UK) LX50/54.

- Sibelius: Karelia Suite – Intermezzo. "Symphony Orchestra", cond. Kajanus

28 May 1930, Central Hall, Westminster. [Mx] WYX 19. Columbia (UK) LX54 (last side of 2nd Sym.)

- Sibelius: Karelia Suite- Alla marcia. "Symphony Orchestra", cond. Kajanus

28 May 1930, Central Hall, Westminster. [Mx] WYX 20. Columbia (UK) LX69 (last side of 1st Sym.)

Oskar Fried

- Délibes: Sylvia Ballet suite. British Symphony Orchestra cond. Fried.

30 October 1930, Central Hall, Westminster. [Mx] WAX 5386/9. Columbia (UK) LX 114/5; Columbia (Germany) DWX 5002/3; Columbia (Italy) GQX 10560/1.

1. (a) Prélude. (b) Les Chasseresses. WAX 5836-2
2. (a) Intermezzo (b) Valse Lente (L'escarpolette). WAX 5837-1
3. (a) Pizzicati (b) Cortège de Bacchus, pt.1. WAX 5838-2
4. Cortège, pt.2. WAX 5389-1

=== 1931 ===
Felix Weingartner

These three recordings were issued with "British Symphony Orchestra" on the label, but Columbia's matrix logs state just "Symphony Orchestra", and Michael Gray identifies the ensemble as the orchestra of the Royal Philharmonic Society.

- Leopold Mozart? Toy Symphony. "British Symphony Orchestra" cond. Weingartner. (Note: Label states "Weingartner conducting the British Symphony Orchestra" "Toy Symphony". 45worlds.com.) (Note: This was one of Columbia's best sellers, only disappearinig from the catalogues in 1954.)

7 April 1931, Central Hall. [Mx] WAX 6046/7. Columbia (UK) DX311.

- Johann Strauss II: A Thousand and One Nights. "British Symphony Orchestra" cond. Weingartner. (Note: The label states "Weingartner and British Symphony Orchestra".)

8 May 1931, Central Hall. [Mx] WAX 6048-2, WAX 6049-2. Columbia (UK) LX 133; (US) Set ML-4777; Nippon Columbia W78.

- Johann Strauss II: Voices Of Spring, Op. 410. "British Symphony Orchestra", cond. Weingartner. (Note: Columbia's original matrix info states "Symphony Orchestra". Gray adds [Orchestra of the Royal Philharmonic Society]. Label states "Weingartner and British Symphony Orchestra".)

8 May 1931, Central Hall. [Mx] WAX 6050/1. Columbia (UK) DX266; (US) Viva-Tonal J7897

Bruno Walter

- Mozart: Serenade for Strings, No. 13, K.525 (Eine kleine Nachtmusik). British Symphony Orchestra cond. Walter. (Note: Columbia's original matrix info states "Symphony Orchestra". Gray adds '[British] Symphony Orchestra'. Label states "The British Symphony Orchestra.) (Note: "I am most in agreement with Walter's tempo here when it is quick, which is to say the first, second, and final movements from 1931 and the third from 1954. However, the recording of the British Symphony set is very antiquated, and only serious Walter students will find it of interest." And, of course, those writing a history of the British Symphony Orchestra...) (Note: Reviews: WALTER Rarities Vol. 2 - MusicWeb International review: "Bruno Walter revisited Eine Kleine later, too (including versions from Vienna, San Francisco and Stockholm, so it is fair to say he travelled the world with this piece); here is the very first take, the British Symphony Orchestra in May 1931 in Central Hall, Westminster. Neat and always musical, with the odd agogic that today raises an eyebrow, one has to admire the integrity of Walter's reading. The Romanza is an adagio here, but a beautifully shaded one; the Menuetto again what feels today like on the slow side and a touch ponderous. The finale has a lovely light step though.")

21 May 1931, Central Hall. [Mx] WAX 6104/7. Columbia (UK) LX144/5; (US) Masterworks Set X-19 (68016/7-D, MX 70422/3-D)

- Wagner: Götterdämmerung, Act 3 – Siegfried's Funeral March. British Symphony Orchestra cond. Walter.

22 May 1931, Central Hall, Westminster. [Mx] WAX 6108-2, WAX 6109-1. Columbia (US) 68044-D; (Note: The US label states "Bruno Walter with Symphony Orchestra".) Columbia (UK) LX156. (Note: The UK label states "Bruno Walter Conducting / the British Symphony Orchestra".)

=== 1932 ===
Felix Weingartner

The recording of Beethoven's median symphony has been subject to considerable scrutiny. (Note: According to Mark Obert-Thorn: "As noted by Christopher Dyment (Dyment 1976, p. 80), the discographic details of the recording sessions are vague; neither the venue nor even the ensemble can be identified with certainty." Dyment compares the sound to that of Walter's Nozze die Figaro overture made with the British Symphony Orchestra "a few days later" [actually a month later], and says it was "almost certainly held in the Central Hall, probably with this orchestra." Dyment also says that Columbia regarded the recording as "too faint", and issue was limited to the USA, "where the record labels identify the orchestra simply as "Symphony Orchestra"." Obert-Thorn evokes memories of Boult's orchestra from the 20s, which hadn't given a public concert or made a recording since 1923.)

- Beethoven: Symphony No. 5 in C minor, Op. 67. Unnamed orchestra cond. Weingartner.

17–18 March 1932, unnamed location. [Mx] CAX 6348/6355. Columbia (US only) 68078-D through 68081-D, in Masterworks Set 178.

- Leo Delibes: Ballet, Naila – Waltz. Columbia Symphony and unnamed conductor.

18 March 1932, unnamed location. [Mx] CAX 6358. Columbia: Unissued.

Bruno Walter

These five recordings all state "British Symphony Orchestra" on the label, although according to Michael Gray Columbia's own logs only specify the Marriage of Figaro overture as actually being played by the BSO: the other four have the usual plain "Symphony Orchestra".

- Wagner: Die Meistersinger von Nurnberg – Prelude to Act III. Symphony Orchestra (as BSO) cond. Walter.

15 April 1932, Central Hall, Westminster. [Mx] CAX 6383-1, CAX 6384-1. Columbia (US) CX43; (UK) LX180.

- Wagner: Götterdämmerung: Siegfried's Rhine Journey. Symphony Orchestra (as BSO) cond. Walter. (Note: "There are acoustical versions of both these works and an even earlier electrical attempt at the Rhine Journey, but if Walter's performances of this music are to be recalled. the above- mentioned are the only valid means. Despite dated sonics, the basic substance of two powerful readings is preserved. The Rhine Journey, incidentally, begins with the dawn music. thus offering a somewhat fuller text than one normally hears (except in the Toscanini version)."(Marsh 1964))

15 April 1932, Central Hall, Westminster. [Mx] CAX 6385-2, CAX 6386-2. Columbia (US) 68101-D; (UK) LX191; (JP) J8140.

- Mozart: Le nozze di Figaro, K.492 – Overture. British Symphony Orchestra cond. Walter. (Note: Coupled on LX232 with "Dance of the Apprentices" by "Symphony Orchestra", [Mx] CAX 6398-2.) (Note: "Again, there is an even earlier acoustic version, which can be forgotten along with the 1932 effort." (Marsh 1964))

15 April 1932, Central Hall, Westminster. [Mx] CAX 6387-2. Columbia (UK) LX232; (US) 68133D.

- Beethoven: Violin Concerto in D, Op. 61. Joseph Szigeti (violin), Symphony Orchestra (as BSO) cond. Walter.

18 April 1932, Central Hall, Westminster. [Mx] CAX 6388/97 (10 sides). Columbia (US) "Masterworks" set M-177; (UK) LX 174/8.

- Wagner: Die Meistersinger von Nürnberg, Act III – Dance of the Apprentices. Symphony Orchestra (as BSO) cond. Walter. (Note: Note: The US and UK 78 rpm issues have different couplings. The US issue is paired with Walter's 1930 recording of Beethoven's "Prometheus" Overture with "Symphony Orchestra". The UK coupling is paired with Walter's (some say Harty's) performance of Mozart's "Le Nozze di Figaro" Overture.)

19 April 1932, Central Hall, Westminster. [Mx] CAX 6398-2 (one side). Columbia (US) CX43 (Coupled with Beethoven's Prometheus Overture above); Columbia (UK) LX232 (Coupled with the Le nozze di Figaro overture above).

Henry Wood

The three final recordings listed here were all released with "British Symphony Orchestra" on the label, although the first pressings of the Bach arrangements unaccountably stated "London Symphony Orchestra" on the label. (Note: The LSO's first recording contract was made with Columbia in 1920, but its Board had transferred allegiance to the Gramophone Company's His Master's Voice label in 1926. Columbia and the Gramophone Company had merged the previous year, 1931, to form EMI, so this may possibly have been a sort of in-joke. Wood's first "official" recordings with the LSO were made for Columbia in October 1933 (Schubert's 'Unfinished' symphony, and the Litolff Scherzo with Irene Scharrer). The producer was Joe Batten, who had recorded Boult with the BSO for Velvet Face a decade previously.) Wood's last previous recording was of Brandenburg 6 in June 1930. The final recording listed here was made about a week after Beecham's first concert with the LPO, (Note: In late October 1932 Wood made the very first recordings with the new London Philharmonic Orchestra at His Master's Voice's Abbey Road Studios: Franck's Symphonic Variations and Liszt's 1st Piano Concerto with Walter Gieseking.) formed out of the "old" RPO, the orchestra of the Royal Philharmonic Society, which has figured throughout this discography. (Note: Beecham would revive the name after WW2 in 1947, when he founded the Royal Philharmonic Orchestra, which perhaps echoes Raymond Rôze's second formation of the British Symphony Orchestra after WW1.)

- Bach: Brandenburg Concerto No. 3 in G. British Symphony Orchestra cond. Wood.

16 June 1932, Central Hall, Westminster. [Mx] CAX 6439-2, CAX 6440-1. Columbia (US) 68084-D; Columbia (UK) LX 173 (76.1rpm).

- Bach-Wilhemj: Orchestral Suite No. 3 in D, BWV 1068 – Air on the G String

Bach-Wood: Unaccompanied Partita for Violin No. 3 in E, BWV 1006 - Gavotte. British Symphony Orchestra cond. Wood. (Note: This is almost more convoluted than the Weingartner Beethoven 5.: 1. Gray says unnamed orchestra and location, although recorded the same day as the previous entry.; 2. UK & US catalogues say British Symphony Orchestra.; 3. 1st label DX475 says LSO.; 4. 2nd label DX475 says BSO.; 5. First released on L1994. Columbia had used this cat. num. twice previously, both times for Wood cond. New Queen's Hall Orchestra: for a 2-disc set (L1993/4) [Mx} WAX 1458/60, 15 March 1926, no loc. Götterdämmerung - Song of the Rhine Maidens [with Aubrey Brain leading the horn section], (3 sides).; L1994, [Mx] WAX 2580 (1 side), 13 April 1927, Scala Theatre. Die Walküre - Walkurenritt (Ride of the Valkyries).) (Note: This was one of Columbia's best sellers, only disappearing from the catalogues in 1955.)

16 June 1932, unnamed location. [Mx] CAX 6441/2. Columbia (UK) L1994, DX475

- Percy Grainger: Molly on the Shore and Mock Morris. British Symphony Orchestra cond. Wood. (Note: "This needs careful registration if the thick string writing is to come through, as it can do, clearly. In this instance clarity gives way to energy. The problem here, and Molly on the Shore (reverse side), is not an easy one, though be solved. To some extent the music is its own enemy, its downright appearance denying the subtlety with which it should be performed.") (Note: Rec. 16 October 1932. Curiously, the immediately previous matrix number was recorded by Wood on 16 June 1932.)

16 October 1932, Central Hall, Westminster. [Mx] CAX 6443-2, CAX 6444-1. Columbia (UK) LX 200.

=== Table of selected Columbia recordings 1930-1932 ===
Matrix numbers are given without takes for clarity – see main text for more information where known. The "Refs" column refers back to the main discography to save duplication.

Selected Columbia recordings 1930–1932, not limited to "British Symphony Orchestra"
Date	Venue	Orchestra	Conductor	Composer	Work	Matrix	Cat. Num.	Refs.
26 Mar 1930	Central Hall	Orchestra of the RPS (as RPO)	Weingartner	Beethoven (orch. Weingartner)	Hammerklavier Sonata in B Flat, Op. 106	WAX 5485//92	LX43/7	
1 Apr 1930	Central Hall	Orchestra of the RPS (as RPO)	Weingartner	Josef Strauss	Sphärenklänge-Walzer, op. 235 (Music of the Spheres)	WAX 5500/1	LX40	
1 May 1930	–	British Symphony Orchestra	Smyth	Smyth	The Wreckers – Overture	WAX 5567/8	DX287	
16 May 1930	Central Hall	Symphony Orchestra	Walter	Wagner	Siegfried Idyll	WAX 5584/7	LX79/80	
16 May 1930	Central Hall	Symphony Orchestra	Walter	Wagner	Die Meistersinger von Nürnberg – Act I, Vorspiel	WAX 5588/9	DX86	
16 May 1930	Central Hall	Symphony Orchestra	Walter	Beethoven	The Creatures of Prometheus – Overture	WAX 5590	LX277	
21 May 1930	Central Hall	Symphony Orchestra [RPO]	Kajanus	Sibelius	Symphony No. 1	WYX 1/9	LX65/69	
27 May 1930	Central Hall	Symphony Orchestra [RPO]	Kajanus	Sibelius	Symphony No. 2	WYX 10/18	LX50/54	
27 May 1930	Central Hall	Symphony Orchestra [RPO]	Kajanus	Sibelius	Karelia Suite – Intermezzo	WYX 19	LX54	(Note: Last side of 2nd Symphony.)
27 May 1930	Central Hall	Symphony Orchestra [RPO]	Kajanus	Sibelius	Karelia Suite – Alla marcia	WYX 20	LX69	(Note: Last side of 1st Symphony.)
30 Oct 1930	–	British Symphony Orchestra	Fried	Delibes	Sylvia – Ballet suite	WAX 5836/9	LX114/5	
7 Apr 1931	Central Hall	(as BSO) Orchestra of the RPS	Weingartner	Leopold Mozart?	Toy Symphony, Cassation in G major	WAX 6046/7	DX311; LX45	
8 Apr 1931	Central Hall	(as BSO) Orchestra of the RPS	Weingartner	J. Strauss II	Waltz, A Thousand And One Nights, Op. 346	WAX 6048/9	LX133	
8 Apr 1931	Central Hall	(as BSO) Symphony Orchestra	Weingartner	J. Strauss II	Waltz, Voices Of Spring Op. 410.	WAX 6050/1	DX266	
21 May 1931	Central Hall	(as BSO) Symphony Orchestra	Walter	Mozart	Serenade No. 13 in G major, KV525 Eine kleine Nachtmusik	WAX 6104/5	LX144	
22 May 1931	Central Hall	(as BSO) Symphony Orchestra	Walter	Wagner	Götterdämmerung – Funeral March	WAX 6108/9	LX156	
17 Mar 1932	–	(as Symphony Orchestra) –	Weingartner	Beethoven	Symphony No. 5 in C minor, op. 67	CAX 6348/54	68078/81-D (US only)	
18 Mar 1932	–	Columbia Symphony	–	Delibes	Naila ballet – Waltz	CAX 6358	Unissued	
15 Apr 1932	Central Hall	(as BSO) Symphony Orchestra	Walter	Wagner	Die Meistersinger von Nürnberg – Prelude to Act 3	CAX 6383/4	LX180	
15 Apr 1932	–	(as BSO) Symphony Orchestra	Walter	Wagner	Götterdämmerung – Siegfried's Journey to the Rhine	CAX 6385/6	LX191	
15 Apr 1932	Central Hall	[British] Symphony Orchestra	Walter	Mozart	Le nozze di Figaro K.492 – Overture	CAX 6387	LX232	
18 Apr 1932	Central Hall	(as BSO) Symphony Orchestra	Walter	Beethoven	Violin Concerto in D major, op. 61	CAX 6388/97	LX174/8	
19 Apr 1932	Central Hall	(as BSO) Symphony Orchestra	Walter	Wagner	Die Meistersinger von Nürnberg – Dance Of The Apprentices	CAX 6398-2	LX232	
16 Jun 1932	–	(as BSO) Symphony Orchestra	Wood	Bach	Brandenburg Concerto No. 3 in G major, BWV1048	CAX 6439/40	LX173	
16 Jun 1932	–	(as LSO & BSO) –	Wood	Bach (arr. Wilhemj)	Orchestral Suite No. 3 in G major – (Air)	CAX 6441	L1994; DX475	
16 Jun 1932	–	(as LSO & BSO) –	Wood	Bach (arr. Wood)	Partita for Violin No. 3 in E, BWV 1006 – Gavotte	CAX 6442	L1994; DX475	
16 Oct 1932	–	British Symphony Orchestra	Wood	Grainger	Molly on the shore and Mock Morris	CAX 6443/4	LX200	

== Digital recordings ==
=== Georges Delerue ===
The music for the film La Révolution française, directed by Robert Enrico and Richard T. Heffron in 1989, was composed and conducted by Georges Delerue. It was performed by the British Symphony Orchestra with chorus. This seems to have been an ensemble of freelance musicians from the Greater London area, recorded at His Master's Voice Abbey Road Studios in August 1989.
