= Toy Symphony (disambiguation) =

Toy Symphony may refer to:

- Toy Symphony, a musical composition of unknown authorship dated to the 1760s
- Toy Symphony (Arnold) (1957), a musical composition by Malcolm Arnold
- Toy Symphony (play) (2007), by Malcolm Gow
