= Symphony No. 2 (Sibelius) =

Symphony in four movements by Jean Sibelius

- by Jean Sibelius
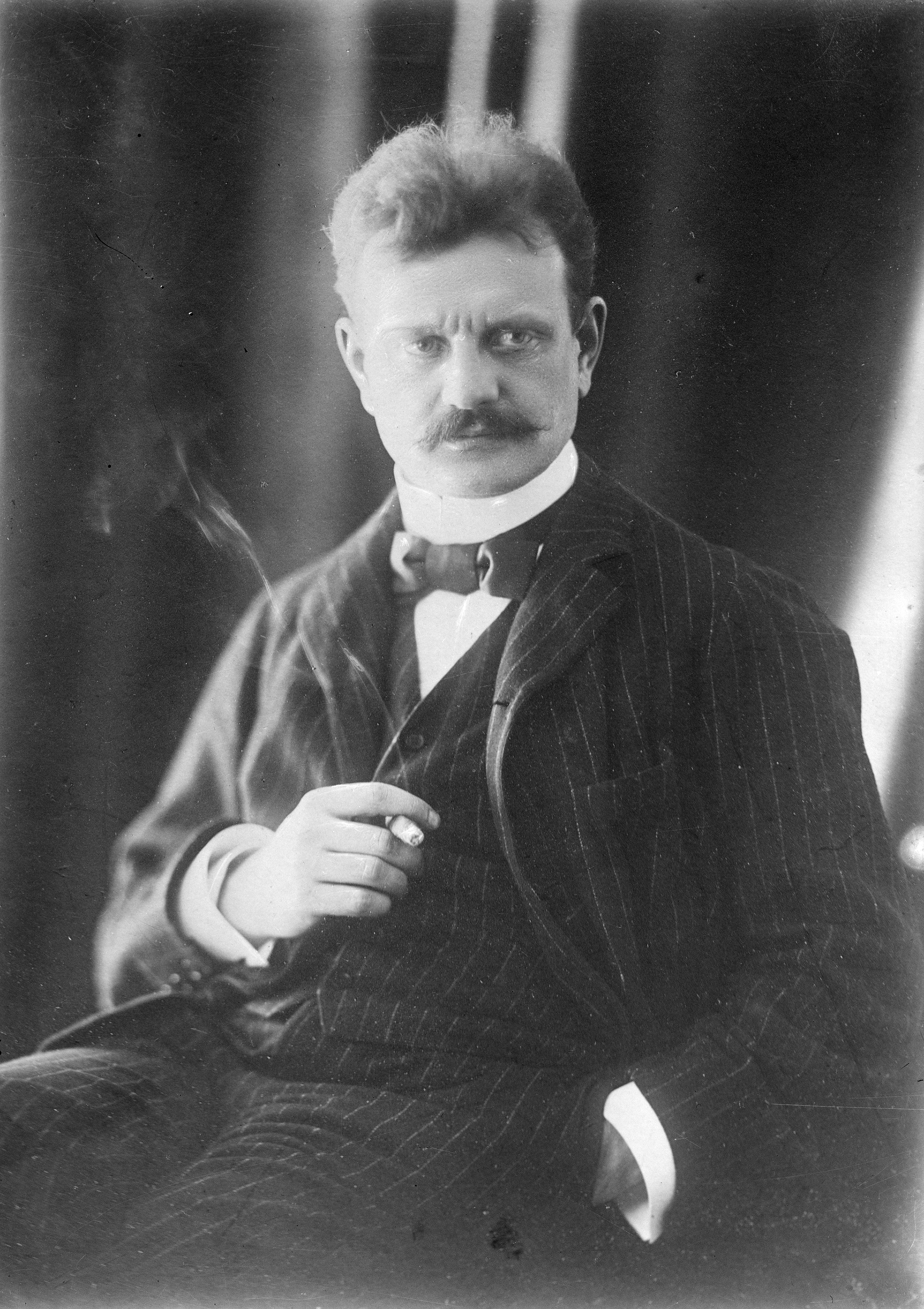
- The composer (c. 1902)
- Key: D major
- Opus: 43
- Composed: 1901–1902
- Publisher: Fazer & Westerlund (1903) (Note: On 20 July 1905, the Helsinki-based music publisher Fazer & Westerlund (Helsingfors Nya Musikhandel) sold its Sibelius holdings (the publishing rights and printing plates) to the German firm of Breitkopf & Härtel.)
- Duration: 46 mins.
- Movements: 4

Premiere
- Date: 8 March 1902
- Location: Helsinki, Grand Duchy of Finland
- Conductor: Jean Sibelius
- Performers: Helsinki Philharmonic Society

The Symphony No. 2 in D major, Op. 43, is a four-movement work for orchestra written from 1901 to 1902 by the Finnish composer Jean Sibelius.

He began writing the symphony in winter 1901 in Rapallo, Italy, shortly after the successful premiere of the popular Finlandia. Sibelius said, "My second symphony is a confession of the soul."

== Background and premiere ==
Baron Axel Carpelan, who gave Sibelius' well-known tone poem Finlandia its name, wrote to the composer shortly after its successful premiere: "You have been sitting at home for quite a while, Mr. Sibelius, it is high time for you to travel. You will spend the late autumn and the winter in Italy, a country where one learns cantabile, balance and harmony, plasticity and symmetry of lines, a country where everything is beautiful – even the ugly. You remember what Italy meant for Tchaikovsky’s development and for Richard Strauss." Although Baron Carpelan was penniless, he raised sufficient funds for Sibelius to stay in a mountain villa near Rapallo, Italy. Here, Sibelius jotted down the first notes to his second symphony.

More than a year after the first motifs were penned, the second symphony was premiered by the Helsinki Orchestral Society on 8 March 1902, with the composer conducting. After three sold-out performances, Sibelius made some revisions; the revised version was given its first performance by Armas Järnefelt on 10 November 1903 in Stockholm. Oskar Merikanto exclaimed that the premiere "exceeded even the highest expectations".

== Reception ==
While critics were divided following the symphony's premiere, the public generally admired the piece as its grandiose finale was connected by some with the struggle for Finland's independence, so that it was even popularly dubbed the "Symphony of Independence", as it was written at a time of Russian sanctions against Finnish language and culture. Sibelius's reaction to this has been widely debated; some claim that he had not intended any patriotic message and that the symphony was only identified by others as a nationalist composition, while others believe that he wrote the piece with an independent Finland in mind. Finnish composer Sulho Ranta said, "There is something about this music – at least for us – that leads us to ecstasy; almost like a shaman with his magic drum."

The symphony has been called "one of the few symphonic creations of our time that point in the same direction as Beethoven’s symphonies". However, Virgil Thomson wrote in the New York Herald Tribune that the symphony was "vulgar, self-indulgent, and provincial beyond all description". Sir Colin Davis quoted Wordsworth for one of his recordings of the symphony with the London Symphony Orchestra:

Grand in itself alone, but in that breach
Through which the homeless voice of waters rose
That dark deep thoroughfare, had Nature lodged
The Soul, the Imagination of the whole.

== Instrumentation ==
The Second Symphony is scored for the following instruments, organized by family (woodwinds, brass, percussion, and strings):

- 2 flutes, 2 oboes, 2 clarinets (in A for Movements I–II and IV; in B♭ for Movement III), and 2 bassoons
- 4 horns (in F), 3 trumpets (in F), 3 trombones, and tuba
- Timpani
- Violins (I and II), violas, cellos, and double basses

== Structure ==
External audio
- Performed by the San Francisco Symphony, Herbert Blomstedt conducting
- I. Allegretto – Poco allegro – Tranquillo, ma poco a poco...
- II. Tempo andante, ma rubato – Andante sostenuto
- III. Vivacissimo – Lento e suave – Largamente
- IV. Finale (Allegro moderato)

The Second Symphony is written in four movements:

1. Allegretto – Poco allegro – Tranquillo, ma poco a poco ravvivando il tempo all'allegro – Poco largamente – Tempo I – Poco allegro (in D major)
2. Tempo andante, ma rubato – Poco allegro – Molto largamente – Andante sostenuto – Andante con moto ed energico – Allegro – Poco largamente – Molto largamente – Andante sostenuto – Andante con moto ed energico – Andante – Pesante (in D minor)
3. Vivacissimo – Lento e soave – Tempo primo – Lento e soave – (attacca) (in B♭ major)
4. Finale: Allegro moderato – Moderato assai – Meno moderato e poco a poco ravvivando il tempo – Tempo I – Largamente e pesante – Poco largamente – Molto largamente (in D major)

It is his longest symphony, with a duration of approximately 45 minutes.

=== First movement ===
Tying in with Sibelius' philosophy on the art of the symphony—he wrote that he "admired [the symphony's] severity of style and the profound logic that created an inner connection between all the motifs"—the work grows almost organically out of a rising three-note motif heard at the opening of the work, first unstable and pastoral, then appearing in many guises throughout the entire symphony (and indeed forming the basis for most of the material), including forming the dramatic theme of the finale. More phrases are invisibly introduced, although very much related, creating a jigsaw puzzle-like effect. It is only at the climax of the movement that the full theme is heard.

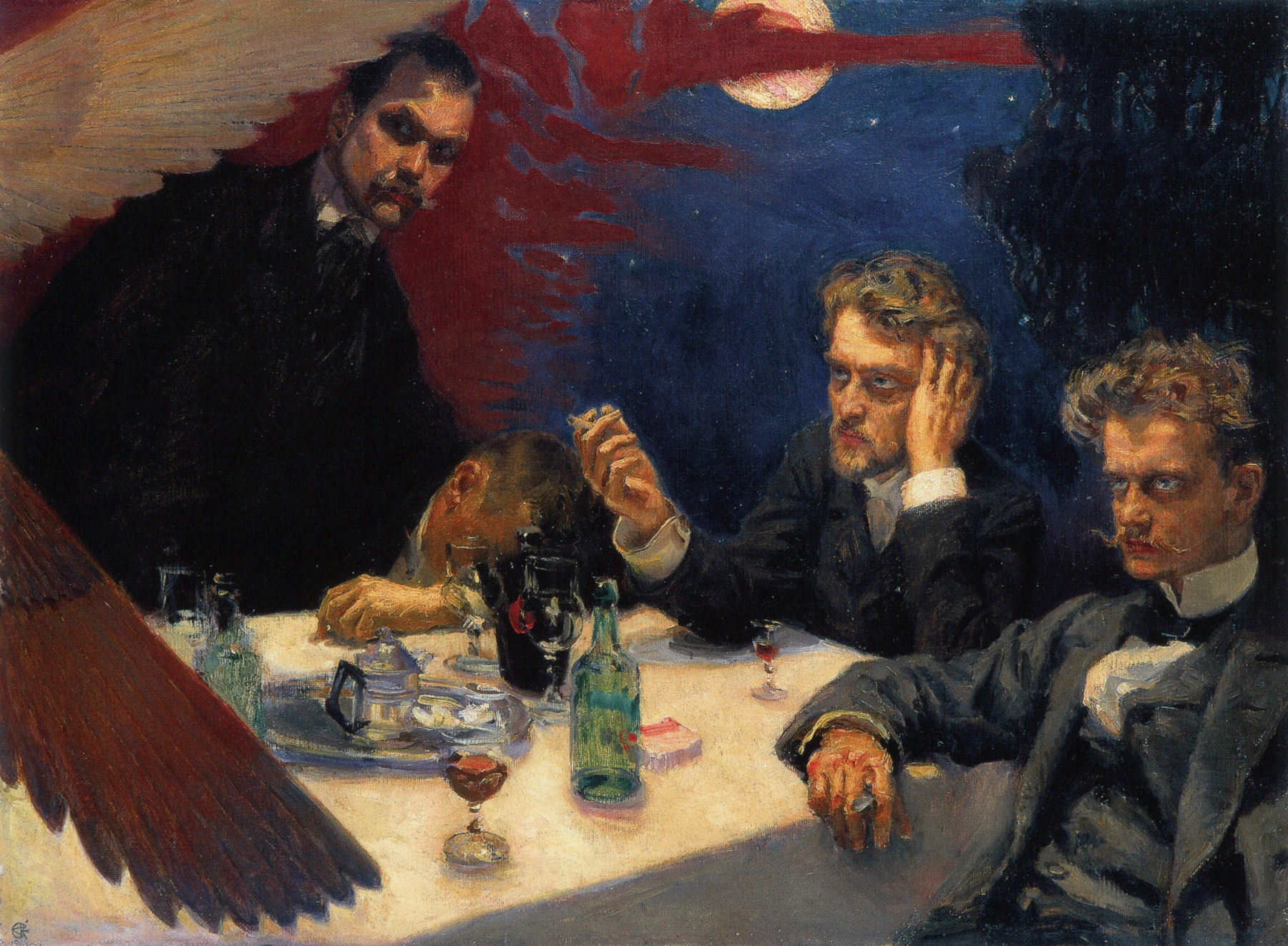
Robert Kajanus and Jean Sibelius (two right-most people), in an 1894 painting by Akseli Gallen-Kallela

=== Second movement ===
In his villa in Rapallo, Sibelius wrote: "Don Juan. I was sitting in the dark in my castle when a stranger entered. I asked who he could be again and again – but there was no answer. I tried to make him laugh but he remained silent. At last the stranger began to sing – then Don Juan knew who it was. It was death." On the same piece of paper, he wrote the bassoon theme for the first part of the second movement, out of which a pizzicatoed string "walking bass" stems. Two months later in Florence, he drafted the second theme, with a note reading "Christus," perhaps symbolizing the death and resurrection of the movement, or even of Finland. Scholars also suggest that Sibelius modeled the second movement after Dante's Divine Comedy. Nonetheless, Robert Kajanus said that the movement "strikes one as the most broken-hearted protest against all the injustice that threatens at the present time to deprive the sun of its light and our flowers of their scent." The movement culminates with a towering, brassy theme, following by an ethereal, mist-like motif in the divided strings.

=== Third movement ===
An angry, restless scherzo with machine-gun figures in the strings is blistering and fast. It is followed by a slow trio section, featuring a lyrical oboe solo accompanied by the clarinets and horns. After a trumpet blast, the scherzo is played again. The trio section returns again at the end of the movement as it bridges to the final movement. Kajanus said, "The scherzo gives a picture of frenetic preparation. Everyone piles his straw on the haystack, all fibers are strained and every second seems to last an hour. One senses in the contrasting trio section with its oboe motive in G-flat major what is at stake."

=== Finale ===
Without pause, the final movement, toward which the rest of the symphony seems to be building, begins gloriously after finally attaining D major, with colossal, loud, regal, and triumphant themes, often drawn from the first movement of the symphony. Very similar to Beethoven's Symphony No. 5, the transitional material from between the last two movements is brought back a second time so the victory of the major key can be savored anew. This movement, inspired by Romantic music, is "Italian music gone North." Kajanus wrote that the last movement "develops towards a triumphant conclusion intended to rouse in the listener a picture of lighter and confident prospects for the future."

== Recordings ==
The first recording, sponsored by the Finnish Government, was made by Robert Kajanus with an unnamed orchestra for the British Columbia label in May 1930 at the Central Hall, Westminster on nine 78 rpm sides. The final side included the 'Intermezzo' from the Karelia Suite. For more information, see British Symphony Orchestra discography § Robert Kajanus. Kajanus had recorded the First Symphony a week earlier. Although the London Symphony Orchestra and the British Symphony Orchestra are sometimes credited, Mark Obert-Thorn puts forward the view that the ensemble was the Orchestra of the Royal Philharmonic Society, "the old RPO" which served as a long-term concert and recording pickup orchestra. It should not be confused with the Royal Philharmonic Orchestra founded by Sir Thomas Beecham in 1947.

Arturo Toscanini and the NBC Symphony Orchestra performed the symphony during broadcast concerts in 1939 and 1940 in NBC Studio 8-H; the 1940 performance was commercially released by RCA Victor in 1967 on LP, then later reissued on CD. EMI has released a CD of a concert performance by Toscanini and the BBC Symphony Orchestra in Queen's Hall. One of the more remarkable live performances released on LP and CD was by Sir Thomas Beecham and the BBC Symphony Orchestra in the Royal Festival Hall in 1954, during which Beecham shouted encouragement to the musicians several times.

On the Saturday 5 January 2013 broadcast of BBC Radio 3's CD Review – Building a Library, music critic Erica Jeal in her survey recommended the 1995 recording by the London Symphony Orchestra, conducted by Colin Davis, as the best available choice.

The violinist and composer Anthony Collins recorded the symphony with many revisions, saying that "Conductors must have liberty to get performance living." In his 1935 recording with the Boston Symphony Orchestra, Serge Koussevitzky conducted the same version that Collins used. Sibelius praised the recording, saying that Koussevitsky "performed my work with supreme mastery. I shall ever be deeply grateful to him for all that he has done for my art."
