= Anderson Tyrer =

British and New Zealand pianist, conductor and composer

Frank Anderson Tyrer (17 November 1891 – 16 December 1962) was an English concert pianist, composer and first conductor of New Zealand's National Orchestra.

== Biography ==
Tyrer was born in Accrington, Lancashire in 1891 and studied at the Royal Manchester College of Music. He won a scholarship of four years from the County Council. He served in the Army in 1914 to 1918.

He made his debut at a Promenade concert under Thomas Beecham in 1919, playing the Rachmaninoff second concerto. Over the next four years he gave a series of orchestral concerts in the Queen's Hall, London, playing concerti by Beethoven, Rachmaninoff, Grieg, Tchaikovsky, Arensky, Liszt and Mackenzie. He also played the piano part in Scriabin's Prometheus several times.

In around 1922 Tyrer made some gramophone records with Adrian Boult and the British Symphony Orchestra for the Velvet Face (V-F) label, a department of Edison Bell Records; the recordings included Liszt's Piano Concerto No. 1 in E flat and Franck's Symphonic Variations.

He toured Canada, Australia, New Zealand and South Africa as a performer, conductor and musical examiner. He visited New Zealand during the 1930s, often as a music examiner.

He performed as a soloist with and conducted the Wellington Symphony Orchestra. In 1940 he became conductor of the New Zealand Centennial Music Festival Orchestra which played concerts in several cities between May and June. The orchestra played his composition Dr Faustus (1940), a symphonic setting for chorus and orchestra based on Marlowe's poem. He was the founding conductor of the New Zealand National Orchestra, now the New Zealand Symphony Orchestra, from 1946 to 1950.

His composing style was English and of the first half of the 20th century. He wrote symphonic works, a piano concerto, piano pieces and songs.

== See also ==
- British Symphony Orchestra discography – for details of recordings of Anderson Tyrer

== Sources ==
- Arthur Eaglefield Hull, A Dictionary of Modern Music and Musicians (Dent, London 1924).
- Joy Tonks, The New Zealand Symphony Orchestra, The First Forty Years (Reed Methuen, Auckland, 1986)
