= List of compositions by Malcolm Arnold =

This is a selective list of the works of Malcolm Arnold, listed by genre.

== Ballets ==
- Homage to the Queen (Op. 42, 1953; choreography by Frederick Ashton)
- Rinaldo and Armida (Op. 49, 1954; choreography by Frederick Ashton)
- Sweeney Todd (Op. 68, 1959; choreography by John Cranko)
- Electra (Op. 79, 1963; choreography by Robert Helpmann)

== Orchestral ==
- Symphonies
  - Symphony for Strings (Op. 13, 1946)
  - Symphony No. 1 (Op. 22, 1949)
  - Symphony No. 2 (Op. 40, 1953)
  - Toy Symphony, Op. 62 (1957)
  - Symphony No. 3 (Op. 63, 1957)
  - Symphony No. 4 (Op. 71, 1960)
  - Symphony No. 5 (Op. 74, 1961)
  - Symphony No. 6 (Op. 95, 1967)
  - Symphony No. 7 (Op. 113, 1973)
  - Symphony No. 8 (Op. 124, 1978)
  - Symphony No. 9 (Op. 128, 1986)
- Dance Suites
  - English Dances, Set 1, Op. 27 (1950)
  - English Dances, Set 2, Op. 33 (1951)
  - Four Scottish Dances, Op. 59 (1957)
  - Four Cornish Dances, Op. 91 (1966)
  - Four Irish Dances, Op. 126 (1986)
  - Four Welsh Dances, Op. 138 (1988)
- Overtures
  - Comedy Overture: Beckus the Dandipratt, Op. 5 (1943)
  - The Smoke (Overture), Op. 21 (1948)
  - A Sussex Overture, Op. 31 (1951)
  - Tam o' Shanter Overture, Op. 51 (1955)
  - A Grand, Grand Festival Overture for three vacuum cleaners, a floor polisher, four rifles and orchestra, Op. 57 (1956)
  - Commonwealth Christmas Overture, Op. 64 (1957)
  - Sunshine Overture, Op. 83 (1964)
  - Peterloo Overture, Op. 97 (1968)
  - Anniversary Overture, Op. 99 (1968)
  - The Fairfield Overture, Op. 110 (1972)
  - Robert Kett Overture, Op. 141 (1988)
- Sinfoniettas
  - Sinfonietta No. 1, Op. 48 (1954)
  - Sinfonietta No. 2, Op. 65 (1958)
  - Sinfonietta No. 3, Op. 81 (1964)
- Divertimentos
  - Divertimento No. 1, Op. 1 (1945)
  - Divertimento No. 2, Op. 24 (1950), revised as Op. 75 (1961)
- Little Suites
  - Little Suite No. 1, Op. 53 (1955)
  - Little Suite No. 2, Op. 78 (1961)
  - Little Suite No. 3, Op. 142 (1990)
  - Little Suite No. 4, Op. 80a (1963)
  - Little Suite No. 5, Op. 93a (1957)
- Miscellaneous
  - Larch Trees, Op. 3 (1943)
  - Symphonic Suite, Op. 12 (1945-46 – lost)
  - Serenade for Small Orchestra, Op. 26 (1950)
  - Symphonic Study Machines Op. 30 (1951)
  - Sarabande and Polka from Ballet 'Solitaire' (1956)
  - Sweeney Todd Concert Suite, Op. 68a (1959)
  - The Song of Simeon, Op. 69 (1959)
  - Carnival of Animals, Op. 72 (1960)
  - Grand Concerto Gastronomique, Op. 76 (1961), for eater, waiter, food and orchestra
  - Water Music, Op. 82 (1964)
  - Severn Bridge Variations (1966, part of a composite work composed by Arnold, Alun Hoddinott, Nicholas Maw, Daniel Jones, Grace Williams and Michael Tippett)
  - Padstow Lifeboat March, Op. 94 (1967)
  - Salute to Thomas Merritt, Op. 98 (1987)
  - Concerto for 28 players, Op. 105, (1970)
  - A Flourish For Orchestra, Op. 112 (1973)
  - Philharmonic Concerto, Op. 120 (1976)
  - Variations For Orchestra On A Theme Of Ruth Gipps, Op. 122 (1977)
- Suites from Film Music
  - The Bridge on the River Kwai concert suite (1957; orchestra)
  - The Inn of the Sixth Happiness (Suite) (1992)

== Concerto ==
- Concerto for Two Violins and String Orchestra, Op. 77 (1962)
- Piano
  - Concerto for Piano Duet and Strings, Op. 32 (1951)
  - Concerto for Piano 3 Hands and Orchestra, Op. 104 (1969); better known as Concerto for Phyllis and Cyril)
  - Fantasy on a Theme of John Field for Piano and Orchestra, Op. 116 (1975)
- Viola Concerto, Op. 108 (1971)
- Cello Concerto Shakespearean, Op. 136 (1988)
- Flute
  - Flute Concerto No. 1, Op. 45 (1954)
  - Flute Concerto No. 2, Op. 111 (1972)
- Oboe Concerto, Op. 39 (1952)
- Clarinet
  - Clarinet Concerto No. 1, Op. 20 (1948)
  - Clarinet Concerto No. 2, Op. 115 (1974)
- Recorder
  - Recorder Concerto, Op. 133 (1988)
  - Theme and Variations: Fantasy for Recorder and String Orchestra, Op. 140 (1990)
- Horn
  - Horn Concerto No. 1, Op. 11 (1945)
  - Horn Concerto No. 2, Op. 58 (1956)
- Trumpet
  - Trumpet Concerto, Op. 125 (1982)
- Guitar
  - Serenade for Guitar and Strings, Op. 50 (1955)
  - Guitar Concerto, Op. 67 (1959)
- Organ Concerto, Op. 47 (1954)
- Harmonica Concerto, Op. 46 (1954)

== Opera ==
- Henri Christophe (1949; four acts – incomplete, 25 pages in full score) [Libretto: Joe Mendoza]
- Up at the Villa (1951; one act - unfinished, preliminary sketches only) [Libretto: Joe Mendoza, after Robert Browning]
- The Dancing Master, Op. 34 (1952; one act) [Libretto: Joe Mendoza after William Wycherley]
- The Open Window, Op. 56 (1956; one act) [Libretto: Sidney Gilliat after H.H.Munro ("Saki")]

== Vocal and choral ==
- Laudate Dominum (Psalm 150) for choir and organ, Op. 25 (1950)
- Two Ceremonial Psalms, Op. 35 (1952)
- John Clare Cantata, Op. 52 (1955)
- Song of Praise "John Clare", Op. 55 (1956)
- Five Blake Songs, for contralto and strings, Op. 66 (1959)
- The Song of Simeon, Op. 69 (1959)
- Parasol (1960) – TV musical
- Song of Freedom for choir and brass band, Op. 109 (1972)
- The Return of Odysseus, Op. 119 (1976)

== Chamber ==
- Three or more players
  - Phantasy for String Quartet: Vita Abundans (1941)
  - Trio for Flute, Viola and Bassoon Op. 6 (1942)
  - Three Shanties for Woodwind Quintet, Op. 4 (1943)
  - Quintet for Flute, Violin, Viola, Horn and Bassoon, Op. 7 (1944)
  - String Quartet No. 1, Op. 23 (1949)
  - Divertimento for Flute, Oboe and Clarinet, Op. 37 (1952)
  - Piano Trio, Op. 54 (1956)
  - Oboe Quartet, Op. 61 (1957)
  - Quintet For Brass, Op. 73 (1961)
  - String Quartet No. 2, Op. 118 (1975)
  - Brass Quintet No. 2, Op. 132 (1987)
- Two players
  - Duo for Flute and Viola, Op. 10 (1946)
  - Violin Sonata No. 1, Op. 15 (1947)
  - Viola Sonata, Op. 17 (1947)
  - Flute Sonatina, Op. 19 (1948)
  - Oboe Sonatina, Op. 28 (1951)
  - Clarinet Sonatina, Op. 29 (1951)
  - Recorder Sonatina, Op. 41 (1953)
  - Violin Sonata No. 2, Op. 43 (1953)
  - Fantasy for Flute and Clarinet (1960s)
  - Five pieces for Violin and Piano, Op. 84 (1965)
  - Duo for Two Cellos, Op. 85 (1964)
  - Fanfare For Louis (1970), for two trumpets
  - Flute Sonata, Op. 121 (1977)
  - Divertimento for Two Clarinets, Op. 135 (1988)
- One player alone
  - Fantasy for Bassoon Op. 86 (1966)
  - Fantasy for Clarinet Op. 87 (1966)
  - Fantasy for Horn, Op. 88 (1966)
  - Fantasy for Flute Op. 89 (1966)
  - Fantasy for Oboe Op. 90 (1966)
  - Fantasy for Trumpet, Op. 100 (1969)
  - Fantasy for Trombone, Op. 101 (1969)
  - Fantasy for Tuba, Op. 102 (1969)
  - Fantasy for Guitar, Op. 107 (1971)
  - Fantasy for Harp, Op. 117 (1975)
  - Fantasy for Recorder, Op. 127 (1987)
  - Fantasy for Cello, Op. 130 (1987)

== Piano ==
- Haile Selassie - March for Piano (1936)
- Allegro in E minor for Piano (1937)
- Serenade in G for Piano (1937)
- Theme and Variations for Piano (1937)
- Three Piano Pieces (1937)
- Children's Suite, Op. 16 (1947)
- Day Dreams (1938)
- Eight Children's Piano Pieces, Op. 36 (1952) (including no. 8, The Buccaneer)
- Eight English Dances, Opp. 27, 33 (1950/51)
- Hobson's Choice (1953)
- Homage to the Queen (1953)
- Prelude (1945)
- Sarabande and Polka from Solitaire (1956)
- Sonata for Piano (1942)
- The Buccaneer (1952)
- Three Fantasies for Piano, Op. 129 (1986)
- Three Piano Pieces (1943)
- Two Bagatelles, Op. 18 (1947)
- Two Piano Pieces (1941)
- Variations on a Ukrainian Folk Song, Op. 9 (1944)

== Band ==
- Duke of Cambridge (march, composed for the centenary of the Royal Military School of Music), Op. 60 (1957)
- Little Suites
  - Little Suite No 1 for Brass Band, (Prelude, Siciliano and Rondo) Op. 80 (1963)
  - Little Suite No 2 for Brass Band, Op. 93 (1967)
  - Little Suite No 3 for Brass Band, Op. 131 (1987)
- Fantasy for Brass Band, Op. 114 (1974)
- Symphony for Brass Instruments, Op. 123 (1978)

== Film scores (selection) ==
Arnold composed music for 62 feature films (plus several documentaries and TV work) including:

- The Sound Barrier (1952) (dir David Lean)
- Stolen Face (1952) (dir Terence Fisher)
- The Holly and the Ivy (1952) (dir George More O'Ferrall)
- The Captain's Paradise (1953) (dir Anthony Kimmins)
- Albert R.N. (1953) (dir Lewis Gilbert)
- Hobson's Choice (1954) (dir David Lean)
- You Know What Sailors Are (1954) (dir Ken Annakin)
- The Sleeping Tiger (1954) (dir Joseph Losey)
- Twist of Fate (1954 film) (U.S. 'Beautiful Stranger ') (1954) (dir David Miller (director))
- The Belles of St Trinian's (1954) (dir Frank Launder)
- The Sea Shall Not Have Them (1954) (dir Lewis Gilbert)
- 1984 (1956) (dir Michael Anderson)
- Trapeze (1956) (dir Carol Reed)
- The Bridge on the River Kwai (1957) (dir David Lean)
- The Roots of Heaven (1958) (dir John Huston)
- Dunkirk (1958) (dir Leslie Norman)
- The Inn of the Sixth Happiness (1958) (dir Mark Robson)
- The Key (1958) (dir Carol Reed)
- Tunes of Glory (1960) (dir Ronald Neame)
- Whistle Down The Wind (1961) (dir Bryan Forbes)
- No Love for Johnnie (1961) (dir Ralph Thomas)
- The Inspector (1962) (dir Philip Dunne)
- The Lion (1962) (dir Jack Cardiff)
- Nine Hours to Rama (1963) (dir Mark Robson)
- The Chalk Garden (1964) (dir Ronald Neame)
- The Heroes of Telemark (1965) (dir Anthony Mann)
- Sky West and Crooked (1966) (dir John Mills)
- The Reckoning (1969) (dir Jack Gold)
- David Copperfield (1969) (dir Delbert Mann)
