= Columbia Symphony Orchestra =

American orchestra

The Columbia Symphony Orchestra was an orchestra formed by Columbia Records for the purpose of making recordings. In the 1950s, it provided a vehicle for some of Columbia's better known conductors and recording artists to record using only company resources. The musicians in the orchestra were contracted as needed for individual sessions and consisted of free-lance artists and often members of either the New York Philharmonic or the Los Angeles Philharmonic, depending on whether the recording was being made in Columbia's East Coast or West Coast studios.

== Early history ==
Some of the first recordings featuring the Columbia Symphony Orchestra were made in New York in February 1913. (Note: The recording information in this section derives from Michael Gray's database available on CHARM. For more information, see British Symphony Orchestra discography) Felix Weingartner made five acoustic sides in New York with the soprano Lucille Marcel. Only one take was subsequently issued, "Ave Maria" from Verdi's Otello on Columbia US A-5482, matrix number 36622. The other unissued takes included two of Weingartner's own songs, "Vergangenheit" and "Welke Rose", Schumann's "Die Lotosblume", op. 25, no. 7 and Olga von Radecki's "Frisches Grun".

Frank Bridge made a single (unissued) take of Grieg's Shepherd Boy, op. 54 with the orchestra for Columbia UK on matrix AX 268, in London on 14 December 1923. (Note: The US operation of Columbia had been taken over by its UK subsidiary, the Columbia Graphophone Company in December 1922.)

The composer and conductor Robert Hood Bowers made around 15 double-sided 78 rpm recordings with the orchestra in September 1927.

During a recording session in March 1932 with Weingartner and the British Symphony Orchestra in London's Westminster Central Hall, a single unissued take was made of the Waltz from Leo Delibes' ballet Naïla, although the conductor is unnamed. (Note: Columbia's contemporary matrix logs state "Columbia Symphony Orchestra", possibly to circumvent a recording contract.)

Howard D. Barlow (May 1, 1892 – January 31, 1972) made a recording of Deems Taylor's suite Through the Looking Glass with the Columbia Symphony Orchestra in New York in November 1938. Released on Columbia Masterworks set M-350.

== Conductors ==
Over the decades, several noted conductors and soloists collaborated with the Columbia Symphony Orchestra including:

=== Alfredo Antonini ===
External audio
- You may hear the Columbia Concert Orchestra with Alfredo Antonini and Richard Tucker in: Ernesto De Curtis's Torna A Sorriento (Come Back to Sorrento) in 1950; Here on archive.org

From 1941 until 1971, Alfredo Antonini also served as a principal conductor of the CBS Symphony Orchestra while collaborating with noted soloists including Richard Tucker. In 1972 he was cited with an Emmy Award for conducting the orchestra in the television premier of Ezra Laderman's opera And David Wept.

=== Howard Barlow ===
in the later part of the 1930s, Howard Barlow joined forces with the orchestra which was known at the time as the CBS Symphony Orchestra within the Columbia Broadcasting System. Together, they recorded Deems Taylor's "Through the Looking Glass Suite", Op. 12. By 1940, they joined forces once again in a recording of Bach's Air on the G String from the Suite No. 3 for Orchestra and the Bouree from Bach's Suite No. 3 for Unaccompanied Cello. Additional recordings with the orchestra included: Franz Schubert's Symphony No. 2 in B flat major, D. 125 and selections from Engelbert Humperdinck's Hansel und Gretel Suite.

=== Thomas Beecham ===
In 1949, Sir Thomas Beecham made a series of recordings in Columbia Records' 30th Street Studios in New York City with a completely different pickup group, which was also called the Columbia Symphony Orchestra. Later reissued by Sony on CD, the recordings include Dance of the Hours from the opera La Gioconda by Amilcare Ponchielli, the overture to The Merry Wives of Windsor by Otto Nicolai, Carmen Suite by Georges Bizet, and Capriccio Italien by Peter Tchaikovsky.

=== Leonard Bernstein ===
External audio
- You may hear the Columbia Symphony Orchestra and Glenn Gould in: Ludwig van Beethoven's Piano Concerto No.2 in B Flat Major, Op. 19 in 1957; Here on archive.org

Leonard Bernstein conducted the orchestra and also played the piano solos, in Maurice Ravel's Piano Concerto in G and George Gershwin's Rhapsody in Blue. These were released by Columbia in stereo on LP and later reissued by Sony on CD. In addition, Bernstein also joined forces with the orchestra in collaboration with Glenn Gould in a performance of Ludwig van Beethoven's Piano Concerto No. 2 in B Flat Major, Op. 19 and Johann Sebastian Bach's Keyboard Concerto No. 1 in D Minor, BWV 1052 for Columbia Masterworks in 1957

=== Fausto Cleva ===
During his tenure at the Metropolitan Opera in 1959, Fausto Cleva led the Columbia Symphony Orchestra and the noted tenor Richard Tucker in a recording of several popular arias by Giacomo Puccini.

=== Aaron Copland ===
In the early 1960s, the composer Aaron Copland joined forces with the swing clarinetist Benny Goodman and the concert bass-baritone William Warfield to record his Clarinet Concerto along with his arrangement of "Old American Songs" in collaboration with the Columbia Symphony Orchestra.

=== Robert Craft ===
From 1955 onwards, he made many recordings with the CSO, in CBS-projects that were intended to record the Second Viennese School for the first time integrally. In this period, Robert Craft also produced most of the Varèse works with the Columbia Ensemble.

=== Vladimir Golschmann ===
External audio
- You may hear the Columbia Symphony Orchestra with Vladimir Golschmann and Glenn Gould in: Ludwig van Beethoven's Piano Concerto No.1 in C major, Op. 15; Johann Sebastian Bach's Keyboard Concerto No. 5 in F minor, BWV 1056 in 1958; Here on archive.org

Vladimir Golschmann also collaborated with the Columbia Symphony Orchestra in several historic recordings with the young pianist Glenn Gould. Included among their collaborations were recordings of Johann Sebastian Bach's Keyboard Concerti: No. 2, No. 3, No. 4, No. 5 & No. 7, as well as the Beethoven Piano Concerto No. 1 during the 1950s.

=== Alexander Schneider ===
External audio
- You may hear the Columbia Symphony Orchestra with Alexander Schneider and Rudolf Serkin in: Wolfgang Amadeus Mozart's: Piano Concerto No.21 in C major, k. 467; Piano Concerto No. 27 in B flat major, K. 595 in 1957; Here on archive.org

Alexander Schneider paired with Rudolf Serkin and the Columbia Symphony Orchestra during the 1950s in a recording of Wolfgang Amadeus Mozart's: Piano Concerto No. 21 in C major, K. 467 and Piano Concerto No. 27 in B flat major, K. 595.

=== Igor Stravinsky ===
Igor Stravinsky made many recordings of his own compositions with an incarnation of this orchestra, mainly musicians from the Los Angeles Festival Orchestra founded by Franz Waxman. Among the works in which Stravinsky conducted the orchestra are Apollon musagète; Le baiser de la fée; The Firebird – suite and complete ballet; Mass; Mavra; Les noces; Orpheus; Perséphone; Petrushka – suite and complete ballet; Pulcinella – suite and complete ballet; The Rake's Progress; The Rite of Spring; the Symphony in E flat; the Symphony in Three Movements and the Violin Concerto; as well as several shorter pieces.

In 1977, a recording of the Columbia Symphony Orchestra playing the "Sacrificial Dance" from The Rite of Spring, conducted by Stravinsky, was selected by NASA to be included on the Voyager Golden Record, a gold-plated copper record that was sent into space on the Voyager space craft. The record contained sounds and images which had been selected as examples of the diversity of life and culture on Earth.

=== George Szell ===
In the 1960s, George Szell also joined forces with the Columbia Symphony Orchestra and Robert Casadesus for a recording of several piano concertos by Wolfgang Amadeus Mozart including: Concerto No. 22 in E flat major, K. 482 and Concerto No. 23 in A major, K. 488 for Columbia Masterworks (ML5594, 1960).

=== Bruno Walter ===
Among the best-known recordings the orchestra made were with the conductor Bruno Walter, who recorded interpretations of Beethoven, Brahms, Bruckner, Mahler and Mozart symphonies. With this orchestra, Walter made his only stereo recording of Mahler's Symphony No. 9, which he had conducted at its world premiere.

== Other recordings ==
The term Columbia Symphony Orchestra was also used when, for contractual reasons, another orchestra could not appear under its own name. Many Los Angeles Philharmonic musicians also played under the Columbia Symphony name, and some reports mention that the entire philharmonic frequently played as the Columbia Symphony when recorded on the west coast.

== CBS Symphony Orchestra ==
There was also the Columbia Broadcasting Symphony Orchestra, sometimes called the CBS Symphony Orchestra. This group was formed to perform on CBS Radio broadcasts and also made 78-rpm recordings for Columbia Records during the 1940s. It was frequently conducted by Howard Barlow, who later became the music director of "The Voice of Firestone" radio and television programs. One of the Columbia Records releases by the CBS Symphony with Barlow conducting was the "Indian Suites" by Edward MacDowell, recorded on May 15, 1939; this recording can be heard on YouTube. The composer Bernard Herrmann conducted the orchestra for some broadcasts, especially The Mercury Theatre on the Air and The Campbell Playhouse programs presented by Orson Welles.

== Columbia Concert Orchestra ==
In addition, CBS' Columbia Concert Orchestra recorded both classical and popular music for Columbia Masterworks in the 1920s-1950s. Live concerts by the orchestra were also broadcast throughout the United States and to South America via shortwave radio over the International Radio Station WCBX in New York City and the International Radio Station WCAB in Philadelphia from 1939 to 1940 during World War II. Included among the noted collaborators were such operatic luminaries as: Eileen Farrell, Lily Pons, Paul Robeson and Richard Tucker under the direction of several conductors including: Alfredo Antonini, Emanuel Balaban, Howard Barlow, Bernard Herrmann, Andre Kostelanetz, Charles Lichter and Alexander Semmler.
