= City Music Society =

The City Music Society was formed in London, United Kingdom, in 1943. It was influenced by lunchtime concerts organised by Hilda Bor at the Royal Exchange and by Myra Hess at the National Gallery. The driving force in the Society's foundation was Ivan Sutton, with help and encouragement by Bor, who became its Vice-President, and from Edric Cundell, Principal of the Guildhall School of Music, who served as its first President. It was described in an obituary of Sutton as "one of the City of London's most remarkable institutions".

The first event, a lecture by Cundell, took place in December 1943 at the Guildhall School, shortly followed by the first concert, a performance by the Morley College Choir, in January 1944. After subsequent Society concerts at the Chartered Insurance Institute and the Royal Exchange, Sutton succeeded in convincing the Goldsmiths' Company to allow the use of its hall for a series of three evening concerts in the autumn of 1946. In the autumn of 1947 the lunchtime concerts moved from the Guildhall School to the Bishopsgate Institute where the opening concert by Louis Kentner attracted a capacity audience. Since then evening concerts at Goldsmith's Hall and Tuesday lunchtime concerts at Bishopsgate Institute have provided the regular framework within which the work of the Society has evolved. The Society, at present, stages around 26 concerts per year and has over 2000 lunchtime and early evening concerts to its credit. It completed its 60th-anniversary season in April 2004. As well as featuring well-established musicians, the Society's policy has always attempted to invite outstanding young professional artists who are at the beginning of their careers to perform at its concerts, many of whom have since attained international status. Furthermore, over the years the Society has commissioned many new works - on average one every three years - from a wide and diverse range of British composers, including Roger Smalley, Nicholas Maw, Diana Burrell, Richard Rodney Bennett, Elizabeth Maconchy, Phyllis Tate, Robin Holloway, John McCabe, Geoffrey Burgon, Peter-Paul Nash, Kevin Volans and Michael Berkeley.
