= Edison Bell =

British record label

- Founded: 1892
- Status: Defunct
- Genre: Various
- Country of origin: United Kingdom
- Location: London, England

Edison Bell was an English company that was the first distributor and an early manufacturer of gramophones and gramophone records. The company survived through several incarnations, becoming a top producer of budget records in England through the early 1930s until, after it was absorbed by Decca in 1932, production of various Edison Bell labels ceased.

== Background ==
Interest in Edison's phonograph was almost immediate in Britain. In 1879, Edison appointed George Edward Gouraud to represent Edison's European interests in the phonograph and telephone. Edison's overseas plans for his phonograph did not go smoothly, as Gouraud made a significant amount of money exhibiting the phonograph in ways of which met disapproval from Edison. Gouraud was successful at promoting awareness of the phonograph, but was not very good at selling the apparatus. Additionally, legal trouble arose regarding the patents of Chichester Bell and Charles Sumner Tainter, in that Edison's original patent was for recording via indenting the surface, while the Bell-Tainter patents allowed for incising the recording surface. A negotiation for Gouraud's resignation brought the desired results, and as they were in America, the Edison and Bell-Tainter interests were merged into a new company in Britain.

== History ==
The Edison Bell Phonograph Corporation, Ltd. was set up in October 1892 to handle Edison's phonograph manufacturing rights in Great Britain. In November of that year, the Edison Bell Phonograph Company was formed with headquarters at Bartholomew Lane in London. Edison Bell was given the exclusive right to manufacture phonographs in Britain, including the right to any improvements made by Edison, Alexander Graham Bell, Chichester Bell, or Tainter. In late 1892, the company complained that machines of American manufacture were appearing in their proprietary area, but the North American Phonograph Company refused to cease exporting. Edison Bell did not sell phonographs and records, but merely leased them. Edison Bell attempted to keep the disc record out of England, preemptively declaring the device violated their patents, even before William Barry Owen arrived in London to promote the device. Edison Bell spent similar efforts engaged in patent disputes with other would-be phonograph manufacturers, including the Edisonia company run by James E. Hough, a former sewing-machine salesman from Manchester. Hough and Edison Bell eventually came to a mutual agreement and Edison Bell and Edisonia were merged under Stephen Moriarty in 1898 to become the Edison Bell Consolidated Phonograph Company, at Charing Cross Road in London. Sales up to this point had been decidedly sluggish. The American trade paper The Phonoscope blamed Edison Bell's "exorbitant" prices, as the equipment was twice as expensive in England as it was in the United States. Edison Bell was thus assigned patent rights in Australia, China, Japan, South America, and most importantly the United Kingdom. This version of the company sold phonographs and records, while a new organization, Edisonia, Ltd. was created to be the manufacturing arm of Edison Bell. Edison Bell was now the sole corporation with rights to distribute phonographs and Graphophones within Britain. As such, they distributed machines and records made by Edison, Columbia, Pathé, and Puck until 1902.

=== Major producer of cylinder records ===
In 1900 the Bell-Tainter patents expired, and Edison Bell went through a further reorganization that allowed the Thomas Edison company to import or manufacture their own product without any oversight from Edison Bell. The National Phonograph Company (i.e. American Edison) was assigned the rights to Thomas Edison's signature, and National, Edison Bell, Pathé and Sterling were the major producers of phonograph cylinders in the early 1900s.

Edison Bell introduced "Gold Moulded" (mass-produced from a master, as opposed to individually-recorded) cylinders in 1901. In 1904 Edison Bell began building their own phonographs, rather than importing or re-branding machines from other manufacturers. Edison Bell's cylinders, each announced by Harry Bluff, sold very well at this point Edison Bell also acquired the rights to manufacture celluloid cylinders at a much earlier date than Edison, as they cooperated with The Lambert Co. rather than attempting to freeze them out entirely from the market. A 1906 trade war between the Edison Bell and the National Phonograph Co. was largely waged in the trade papers "The Talking Machine News" in London and The Talking Machine World" in New York. The war of words in the press eventually led to a blacklisting of Edison Bell by National, cutting off a large portion of their phonograph supply. Edison Bell concentrated for a time on making cylinders, and was able to largely cut National Phonograph out of the British cylinder market through such tactics as price reductions and creating a slightly larger cylinder than was then standard, yet still fit on a standard mandrel. The war between Edison Bell and National migrated to the courts in 1907, when National sued to enjoin Edison Bell from using the name "Edison". Edison Bell was able to easily defend against this action, as the original contract which established Edison Bell not only allowed the use of the name 'Edison' on all products, but actually required it!

=== Edison Bell transitions from cylinders to discs ===
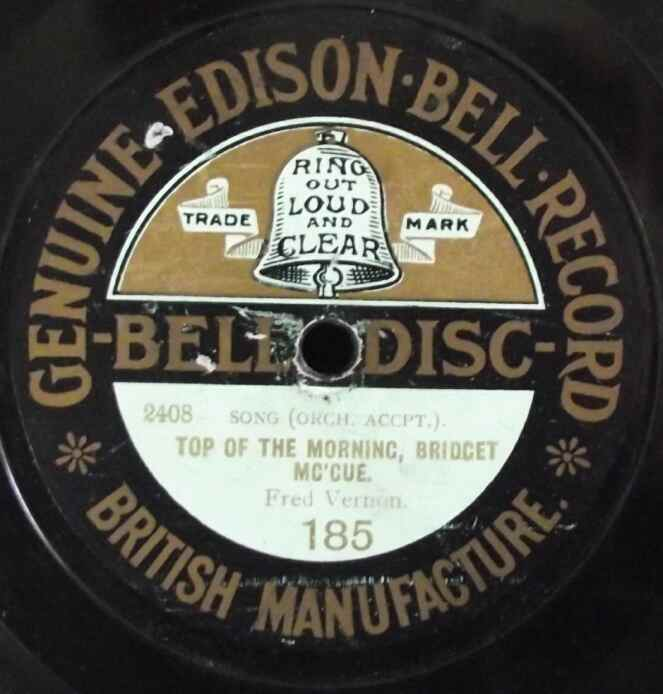
early Edison Bell record label

In 1908 Edison Bell introduced the "Discaphone", a machine that would play both laterally and vertically-cut disc records. This model was made into the 1920s, and has the distinction of being one of the few gramophones of the era with a British-made motor mechanism. The laterally-cut Edison Bell disc label first appeared May 1908. These had a diameter of 10.5 inches and were until the original series was discontinued November 1912 just shy of 500 issues. A few months after the 1908 introduction of the Edison Bell disc records, another disc record label was introduced. Phonadisc Records were vertically cut, and were smaller in diameter at 8.75 inches. That year Edison Bell consolidated a share of the cylinder record market by acquiring rival cylinder company Sterling and Hunting. Ltd. Edison Bell cylinders were marketed under the several names, including Grand Concert, Indestructible Ebony, London, Popular, and Standard.

The Edison Bell company went into bankruptcy in 1909, and manufacture of Edison Bell gramophones and records was taken over by J.E. Hough, Ltd. but in such manner that the general public was highly unlikely to notice. Edison Bell as an entity was formally liquidated in 1910. In 1912 the Edison Bell Winner label was introduced by a Hough syndicate named The Winner Record Co., with catalog numbers beginning at #2000. This label was aimed at the budget market and remained active until 1935. Meanwhile production of cylinder records ceased in 1914. A later gramophone model made by Edison Bell which was popular was the "Handephon", a portable gramophone.

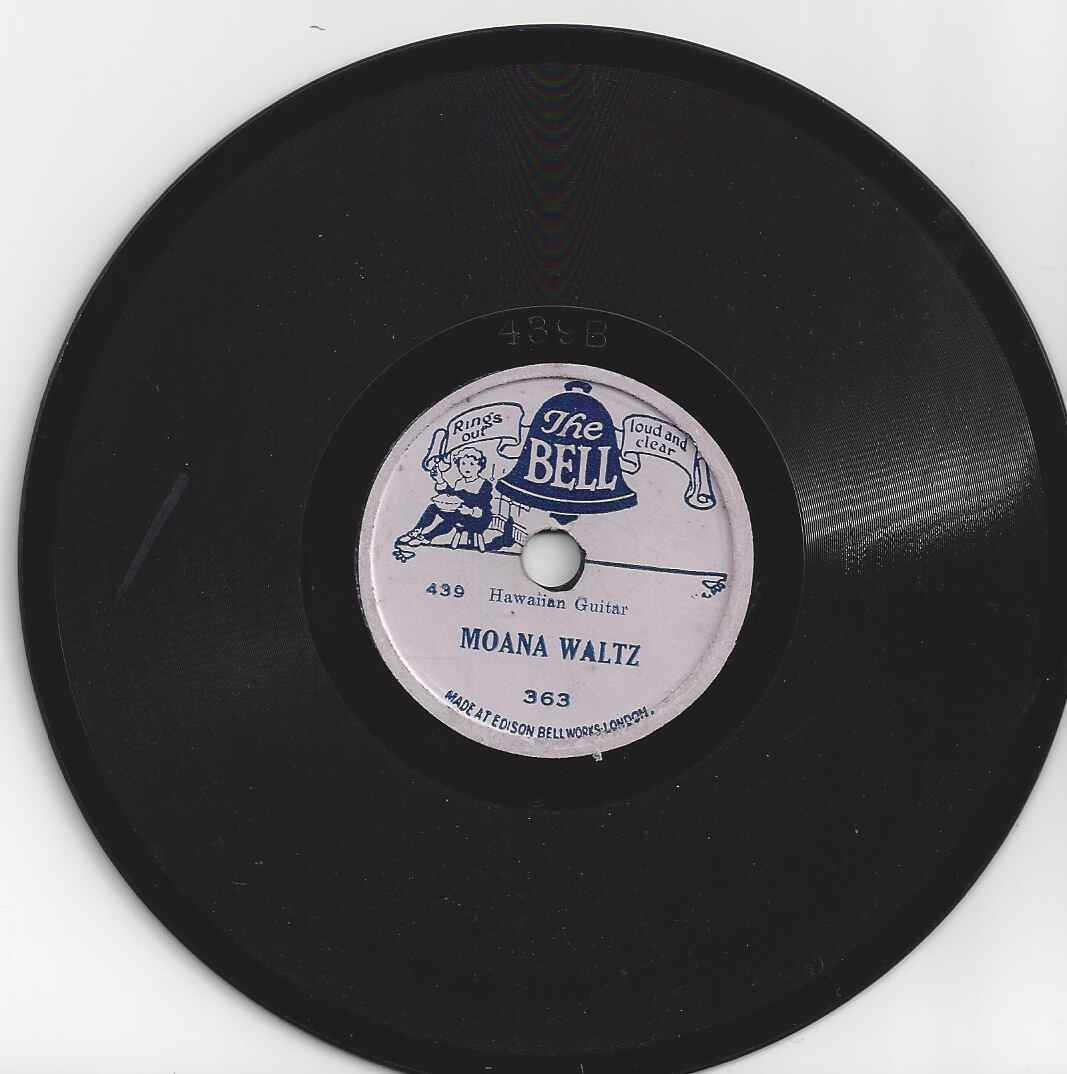
"The Bell" record label, 5-inch disc

In the early 1920s Edison Bell sought to develop a substantial catalog of "serious" music, and selected conductor Joe Batten (1885-1955) to lead the effort.

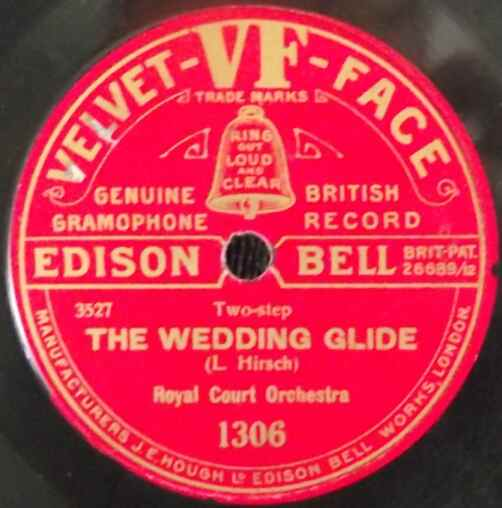
Edison Bell Velvet Face record label

Edison Bell introduced the Edison Bell Velvet Face record label in 1922, which featured uncommon works of classical music. A few of the recordings originated from Gennett Records, but most of the recordings were produced by Edison Bell's recording studios. Notable among these was a 1925 version of Elgar's The Dream of Gerontius conducted by Batten, embodying about three-quarters of the score. This label was discontinued in 1927.

In 1924 Edison Bell made an early attempt at audio-visual entertainment when they introduced the "Picturegram" gramophone. This machine was designed to play small kiddie records while a scroll displaying pictures moved in a compartment located behind the record.

=== Later history and demise ===
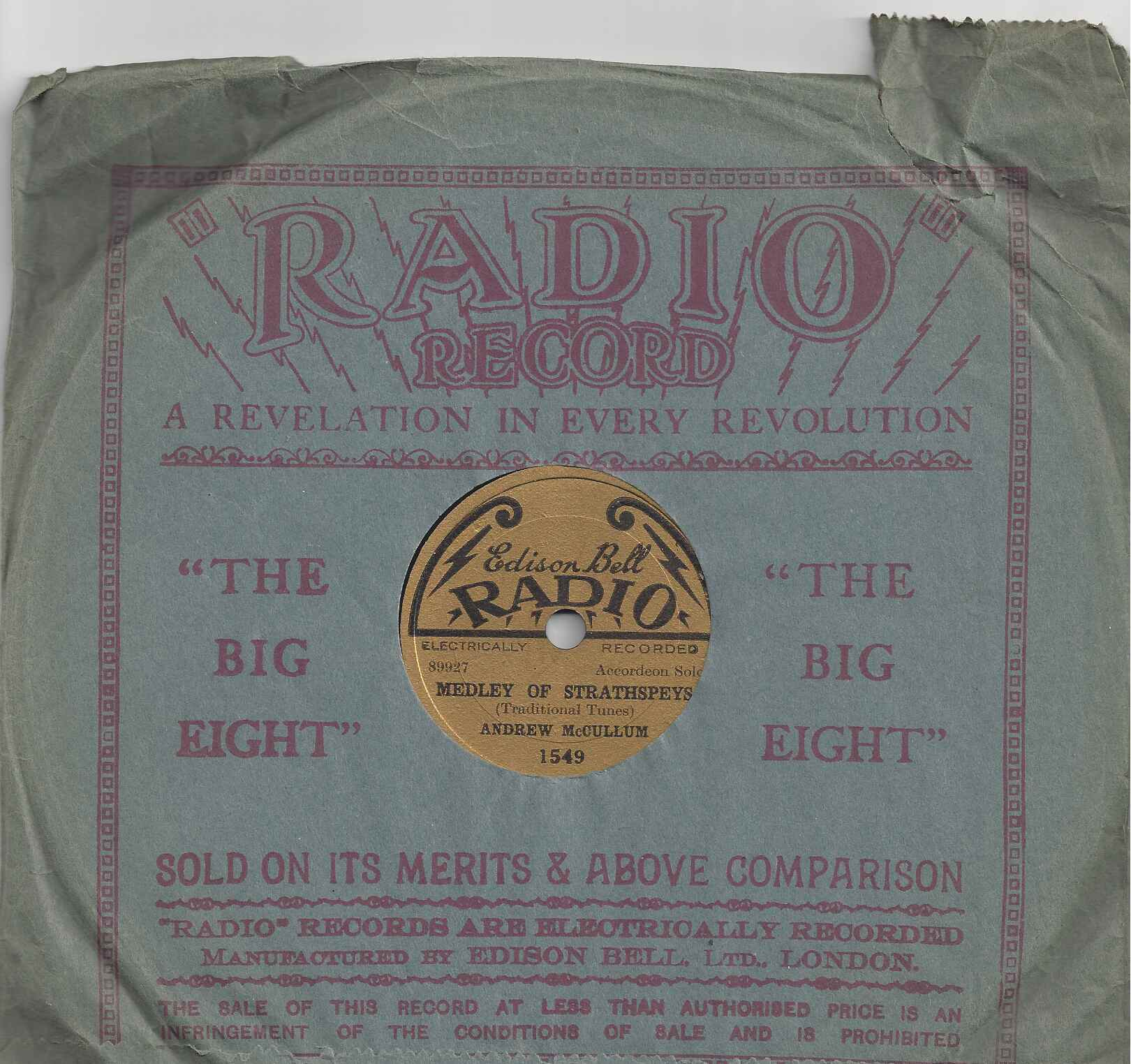
Edison Bell Radio record in original paper sleeve

Hough died in February 1925, and his sons took over management of the company. Edison Bell acquired Beltona Records in 1927, then released recordings originating from Winner to their new subsidiary for a higher-quality record brand named "Electron", from 1927 to 1929. Edison Bell International, Ltd. was formed in 1928 to manage all activities outside of North America. The eight-inch Edison Bell Radio label was introduced April 1928. These featured abbreviated recordings from Banner Records. This series ended April 1932.

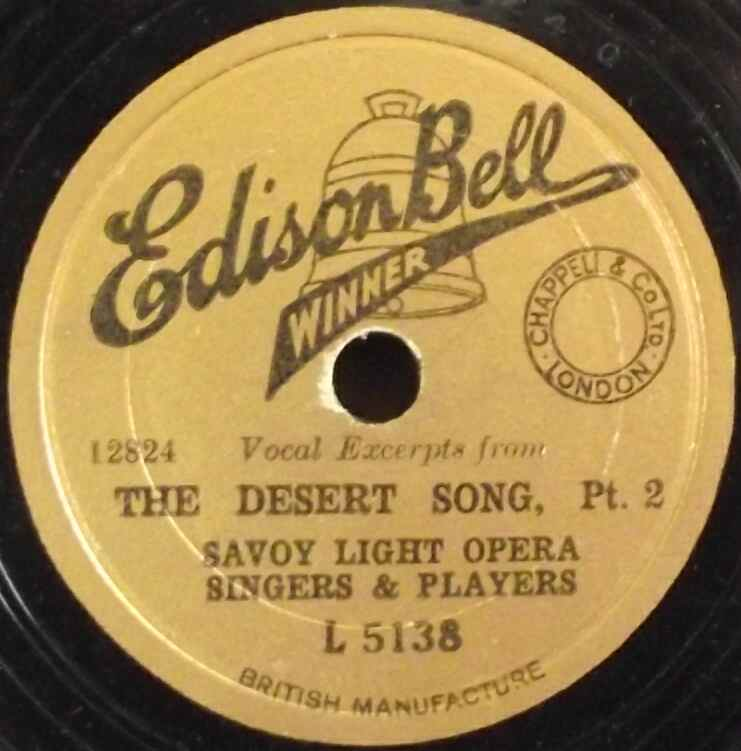
late Edison Bell Winner record label

In early 1933, Edison Bell was acquired by the Decca company, at which time all recording at Edison Bell ceased. Decca continued issuing various Edison Bell labels until 1935.

== Later research ==
The City of London Phonograph and Gramophone Society (CLPGS) publishes a history and full listing of Edison Bell disc records in their Reference Series of books.

== Bibliography ==
- Day, Timothy (2000). A Century of Recorded Music: Listening to Musical History. New Haven, Connecticut: Yale University Press. ISBN 0-300-08442-0.
- Gelatt, Roland (1977). The Fabulous Phonograph. New York: Collier Books. ISBN 0-02-032680-7.
- Hoffman, Frank, ed. (2005). Encyclopedia of Recorded Sound. New York: Routledge. ISBN 0-415-93835-X.
- Miller, Russell; Boar, Roger (1982). The Incredible Music Machine. London: Quartet Books. ISBN 0-7043-2324-9.
- Proudfoot, Christopher (1980). Collecting Phonographs and Gramophones. New York City: Mayflower Books. ISBN 0-8317-3952-5.
- Read, Oliver; Welch, Walter L. (1976). From Tinfoil to Stereo (2 ed.). Indianapolis, Indiana: Howard W. Sams & Co., Inc. ISBN 0-672-21206-4.
- Rust, Brian A. (1984). The American Record Label Book. New York: Da Capo Press. ISBN 0-306-76211-0.
- Welch, Walter L.; Burt, Leah Brodbeck Stenzel (1994). From Tinfoil to Stereo: The Acoustic Years of Recording. Gainesville, Florida: University Press of Florida. ISBN 0-8130-1317-8.
