= Vertical cut recording =

Record groove with varying depth and constant separation between grooves

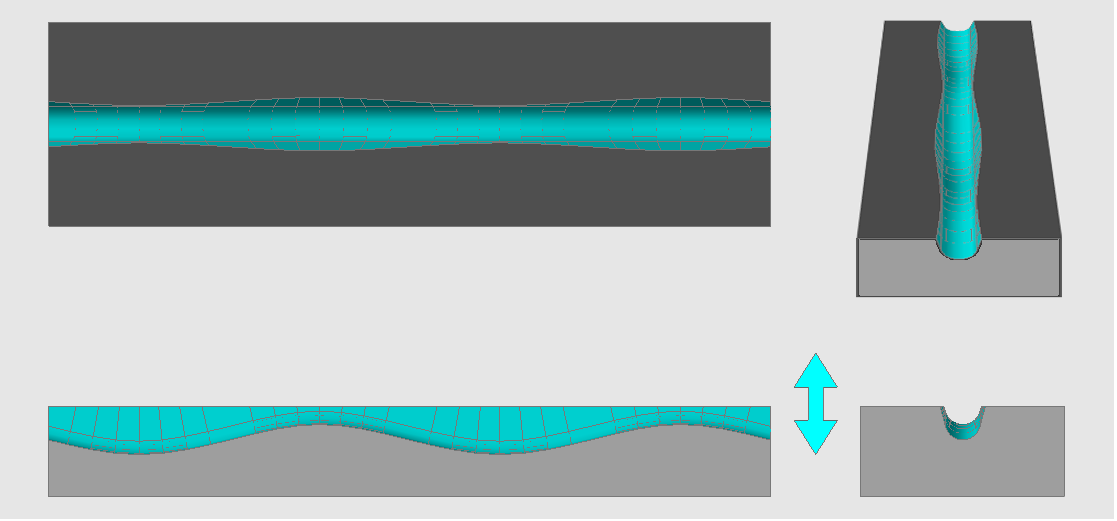
Vertical cut recording groove configuration

The vertical cut recording process is an early method of audio recording by which a stylus cuts a vertical groove into a phonograph record. This is in contrast to the lateral recording system which uses a stylus that cuts side-to-side across a record. The vertical recording process, also known as the hill and dale process, was used to record phonograph cylinder records as well as Edison Disc Records, Pathé disc records, and disc records made by numerous smaller companies. Vertical cut recording was also used as a means of copyright protection by the early Muzak 16-inch background music discs.

In this process the stylus makes a vertical cut, its depth determined in accordance with the current in the recording coil. The grooves of vertically cut records have a constant separation and varying depth, as opposed to grooves of laterally cut records, which have a varying distance of separation and constant depth.

Examining a vertically cut groove along its length reveals a continuous wavy line as the needle cuts at different depths according to the tone and the loudness of the audio being recorded. These grooves show a transition from high to low peak as a smooth curve, giving the characteristic rounded 'hill and dale' effect to the groove, similar to the appearance of many geographic areas.

Recording is by mechanical means and the vibrations from acoustic energy, transferred to a cutting needle, make the needle cut a deeper or shallower groove. It is necessary to set the parameters of the cutting depth accurately: too shallow a groove on silent sections and the playback device, also a needle, will slip out of place; too deep a groove risks cutting through the thin layer of recording medium and/or creating excessive wear when the recording is played back. Due to mechanical noise generated by the recording system, the needle is never totally still; total silence would produce a flat even depth groove, so the hill and dale effect exists over all the audio recording section.
