= Toy Symphony (Arnold) =

Symphony by Malcolm Arnold

The Toy Symphony, Op. 62, is a symphony scored for strings, piano and toy instruments, composed by Malcolm Arnold in 1957. The instruments specified are: quail whistle, cuckoo whistle (doubling guard's whistle), trumpet in F (playing four notes), trumpet in C (one note), trumpet in G (one note), three dulcimers (1; F & C: 2; D & A: 3; B♭ & F), triangle, cymbal and drum, with piano and string quartet.

The piece was first performed at a Savoy Hotel fund raising dinner in London on 28 November 1957 by a group of eminent composers, musicians and personalities: Denis Truscott (who was Lord Mayer of London in 1957), Thomas Armstrong, Edric Cundell, W Greenhouse Alt (Edinburgh organist, 1889–1969), Gerard Hoffnung, Eileen Joyce, Steuart Wilson, George Baker, David McBain (director, Royal Military School of Music), Leslie Woodgate, Eric Coates (just three weeks before his death) and Astra Desmond, with the Amici String Quartet and Joseph Cooper, piano. It was conducted by the composer. The work is dedicated to the Musicians Benevolent Fund. A score was published in 1958 by Paterson.

There are three brief movements, with a total running time of less than ten minutes.

1. Allegro
2. Allegretto
3. Vivace

Although Arnold's Toy Symphony is a modest piece in musical terms when compared to his nine numbered symphonies, as Vincent Budd has pointed out, "the 'big tune' is just as much a winner as the many memorable themes in many concert works". For years, it was the only Arnold Symphony not to have received a professional, commercial recording until a performance by the Orchestra of the Swan conducted by Tom Hammond was issued in February 2020 by Orchard Classics.

Arnold took his precedent from the 18th century Toy Symphony which has typically been attributed to Leopold Mozart, and which similarly uses toy instruments, including nightingale and cuckoo whistles, trumpet, ratchet and drum. There are other toy symphonies by (for instance) Bernhard Romberg (first published 1852), Carl Reinecke (1895), Joseph Horovitz, whose Jubilee Toy Symphony was composed in 1977 for the Silver Jubilee of Elizabeth II and also first performed by a well-known group of musical personalities, and (deploying custom musical toys as electronic controllers) Tod Machover (2002).
