= Edric Cundell =

English composer and conductor (1893–1961)

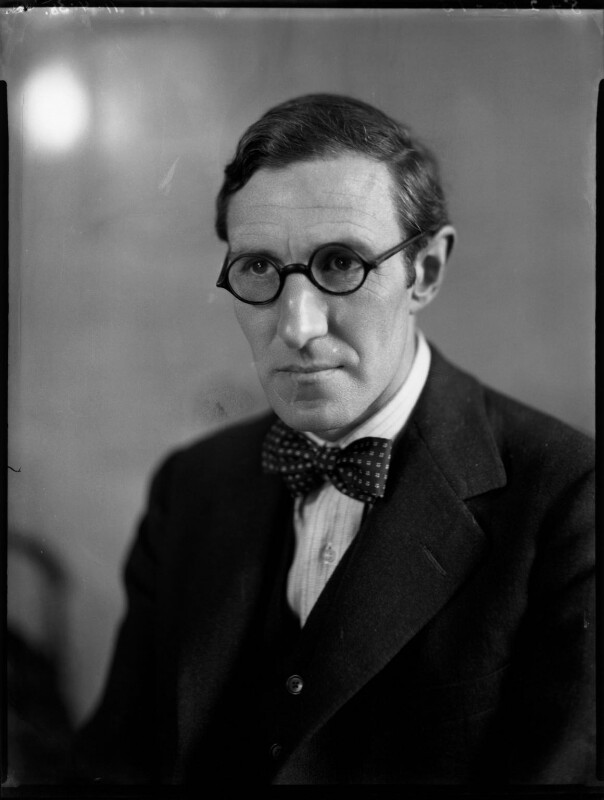
Cundell in 1938

Edric Cundell CBE, (29 January 1893 – 19 March 1961) was a British music teacher, composer and conductor.

== Early life and academic career ==
Born in London, Edric Cundell came from a musical family: his grandmother worked in Paris as an opera singer and both his parents were talented amateur musicians. He was educated at Haberdashers' Aske's Boys' School in Hertfordshire, and went on to study at the London Trinity College of Music, taking French horn with Adolf Borsdorf and piano with Henry Richard Bird (1842–1916). As a horn player, Cundell performed in the 1912 Covent Garden Opera season.

He served as a lieutenant in the artillery in World War I, during which he wrote the symphonic poem Serbia, which was dedicated to King Alexander of Serbia. In Salonika his unit was attached to the Serbian Army and he was awarded the Serbian Order of the White Eagle for his distinguished conduct. While at the front line, Cundell made a cello out of petrol cans and boxes, using a horse's tail for the bow.

After the War, Cundell joined the staff of the Trinity College of Music. At this time he became involved in conducting amateur orchestras, such as the Westminster Orchestral Society, with which he performed his own piece The Tragedy of Deirdre on 4 May 1923 at Kensington Town Hall. He was appointed conductor of another London-based amateur ensemble, the Stock Exchange Orchestra, in 1924. He took guest conductorships in the United States, South Africa and New Zealand while touring as an examiner. In 1937 he joined the musical staff at Glyndebourne, specializing in the interpretation of Mozart and Verdi.

In 1938 he was appointed the principal of the Guildhall School of Music and Drama in London, succeeding Landon Ronald. He held the post until his retirement in 1959, and was noted for conducting many student opera performances there. In 1945, in honour of Carl Flesch, he co-founded what was later known as the Carl Flesch International Violin Competition with Max Rostal. He also acted as a judge in the music competitions at the 1948 Summer Olympics in London. Other posts he held included founding President of the City Music Society, and on committees for the Royal Musical Association, Musician's Benevolent Fund, and the Arts Council.

== Conductor and composer ==
In 1935 he founded the Edric Cundell Chamber Orchestra, which specialised in unusual repertoire. Later on he frequently conducted leading orchestras as guest conductor, such as the Royal Philharmonic, London Philharmonic and the BBC Symphony Orchestra. In 1946 he conducted the National Symphony Orchestra in the film The Magic Bow about the life of Paganini in which Yehudi Menuhin played the violin. In the early 1950s he was director of the Royal Opera House, Covent Garden. Cundell conducted the premieres of Arnold Bax's Fantasies on Polish Christmas Carols in 1945 and Malcolm Arnold’s Toy Symphony at the Savoy Hotel in 1957.

As a composer, he first came to notice through the symphonic poem Serbia, dated "Macedonia, 1917" and written while in a dugout close to the Bulgar front lines. According to a note in the score, the music "is based on folk songs, which the Serbian soldiers used to sing during the time of their great trial, following their tragic retreat over the Albanian mountains. Although this work follows no definite programme, it is descriptive of the general feeling of the Serbian people during the years of the European War." The first performance was in Thessaloniki by the Royal Orchestra. The first UK performances followed in March 1920 (London) and April (Bournemouth), and it was repeated at the Proms on 21 September 1921.

Other Proms performances in the early 1920s included the sonnet for tenor and orchestra Our Dead (premiered on 19 October 1920 with the tenor Gervase Elwes) and various songs. On 4 July 1931 two movements of his Symphony in C minor were performed at Queen's Hall alongside a performance of Portsmouth Point by William Walton. His String Quartet No. 2 won a Daily Telegraph competition in 1933 and was taken up as a repertoire piece (and recorded) by the Griller String Quartet. Blackfriars (1955), as arranged by Frank Wright, became a noted test piece for brass bands.

In 1920 Cundell married the sculptor Helena Harding Scott (1891–1975). The couple had two children, and the family lived at 3 Acacia Gardens, London NW8. He was made a Commander of the Order of the British Empire in 1949. He died at his home, Bear House, Ashwell, Hertfordshire in 1961 at the age of 68.

== Compositions ==
Orchestral and choral

- Blackfriars, symphonic prelude (1955), arranged for brass band by Frank Wright, published Molenaar
- Hymn to Providence, Op. 25, for mixed chorus and orchestra (1928)
- Mass for unaccompanied chorus
- Our Dead, Op. 11, sonnet for tenor and orchestra (1923)
- Piano Concerto
- Serbia, symphonic poem (1917)
- Serenade for strings in D major
- Suite for String Orchestra
- Symphony in C minor, Op. 24 (1924)
- The Tragedy of Deirdre, Op. 17, symphonic poem (1922)

Chamber and instrumental

- April Song for solo piano
- Aquerelle for solo piano
- L'arlesienne suites 1 and 2 (Bizet), arranged for piano (1940)
- "Jesus bleibet meine Freude", (J. S. Bach chorale transcribed for piano)
- "Londonderry Air" (trad. arr. Cundell) for solo piano (1923)
- Piano Quartet, Op. 15 (1922)
- Rhapsody for viola (or cello) and piano (c.1920)
- Sextet for soprano, tenor, bass, violin, viola and cello
- String Quartet No. 1 in G minor, Op. 18 (1923)
- String Quartet No. 2 in C major, Op .27 (1932)
- String Quartet No. 3
- Sunny Days for solo piano
- Two Pieces for Brass Quartet (1957)
- String Sextet Op. 22 (1926)
- Valse Fantasque, Op. 16 (1922)
- The Water Babies: A Fairy Tale for Piano in two parts, for young players (1922)

Songs

- "A Vagabond's Song", words Kate Burnley Belt (1920)
- "Boy Johnny", words Christina Rossetti
- "Hold Though the Morn for Me", words K. B. Belt (1920)
- "I Will Make You Brooches", words Robert Louis Stevenson
- "In the Silence of the Night", words K. B. Belt (1920)
- "Our Dead", tenor and orchestra, words Robert Nichols
- "Remembrance" (1937), words A. Campbell
- "Summer Days and Nights", words K. B. Belt (1920)
