= Toy Symphony =

Divertimento attributed to Joseph Haydn

The Toy Symphony (original titles: Berchtoldsgaden Musick or Sinphonia Berchtolgadensis) is a symphony in C major dating from the 1760s with parts for toy instruments, including toy trumpet, ratchet, bird calls (cuckoo, nightingale and quail), triangle, and drum.

== Form ==
The symphony has three movements and typically takes around ten minutes to perform.

1. Allegro
2. Menuetto – Trio (F major)
3. Finale: Allegro

== Attribution ==
From the 19th century the Toy Symphony was long taken to be a work of Joseph Haydn; however, a stemmatics analysis conducted by musicologist Sonja Gerlach shows that the earliest manuscripts circulating were rather associated with Joseph Haydn's younger brother Michael Haydn. In 1953 musicologist Ernst Fritz Schmid published his discovery of a Cassation in G major for toys, 2 oboes, 2 horns, strings and continuo by Leopold Mozart in seven movements, three of them identical to the well-known toy symphony, and concluded to have likely found the true composer. This position is no longer accepted: it was rather believed that Mozart had incorporated the earlier toy symphony into his own composition, authoring only the remaining four movements.

More recently (1996) the Austrian Benedictine monk Edmund Angerer (1740–1794) has been suggested to be the composer. If Angerer's manuscript (from 1765, entitled "Berchtolds-Gaden Musick") is the original, the Toy Symphony was originally written not in G but in C major. (Note: See the title page, including incipit in staff notation, at "Toy Symphony, title page".)

There is reason to believe that the true composer will likely never be known, in whole or in part, given its confused origins and the paucity of related manuscript sources.

== Other works for toy instruments ==
The Toy Symphony described above was one of a number of anonymous toy symphonies composed at Berchtesgaden near Salzburg, then a manufacturing centre for toy instruments. Some of the instruments used for these can be seen in the Museum Carolino Augusteum in Salzburg.

Other toy symphonies, overtures and works for ensembles by named composers include:

- Felix Mendelssohn: Two Kindersymphonien (1827, 1828)
- Bernhard Romberg: Symphonie burlesque, 'Toy Symphony', Op. 62 (first published 1852)
- Richard Blagrove: Toy Symphony (circa 1850s)
- Ignaz Lachner: Toy Symphony, Op. 85 (circa 1850s)
- August Conradi: Christmas Overture for piano and five toy instruments (1860s?)
- Henri Kling (1842–1918): Kitchen Symphony
- Franklin Taylor: Toy Symphony (circa 1880s)
- Cornelius Gurlitt: Kindersymphonie, Op.169 (1890)
- Carl Reinecke: Kinder-Symphonie, 'Toy Symphony', Op. 239 (1895)
- Emma Lomax: Toy Overture (1915)
- Adam Carse: Childhood's Happy Days, a Toy Suite for piano and seven toy instruments
- Malcolm Arnold: Toy Symphony, Op. 62 (1957)
- Joseph Horovitz: Jubilee Toy Symphony (1977)
- Christopher Brown: Toy Symphony (1986)
- Stephen Montague: A Toy Symphony, for six amateur performers and chamber orchestra (1999)
- Tod Machover: Toy Symphony (2002), uses custom musical toys as electronic controllers.

== Celebrity performances ==
There is a long tradition dating back to at least the 1850s of performing toy symphonies in aid of charity, featuring eminent composers, musicians and personalities. On 14 May 1880 there was such a performance (of Romberg's Toy Symphony) at St James's Hall. In 1918, for the Red Cross and the Order of St John, there was a performance of Richard Blagrove's Toy Symphony (composed circa 1850s) at Queen's Hall, conducted by Landon Ronald. The performers included Edward Elgar (cymbals), Edward German (2nd violin) Myra Hess (nightingale), Benno Moiseiwitsch (triangle) Albert Sammons (2nd violin) and Irene Scharrer (nightingale). Frederick Bridge and Frederick Cowen both played rattles and C. Hayden Coffin and Mark Hambourg castanets.

During the second world war at the National Galley Concert series, on New Year's Day 1940, Myra Hess put on a performance of the Toy Symphony (then still thought to be by Haydn) with performers including the Menges Quartet, Irene Scharrer (with Hess playing the cuckoos), Moiseiwitsch (quail and triangle), Joyce Grenfell and John Simons (nightingales) and Elena Gerhardt, Denise Lassimonne and William Murdoch on percussion.

Malcolm Arnold's Toy Symphony was first performed at a Savoy Hotel fund raising dinner in London on 28 November 1957, with the toy instruments played by Thomas Armstrong, Edric Cundell, Gerard Hoffnung, Eileen Joyce, Steuart Wilson and Leslie Woodgate. Similarly, the Jubilee Toy Symphony by Joseph Horovitz was composed for the Silver Jubilee of Elizabeth II in 1977 and featured Dame Peggy Ashcroft, Richard Baker, Joseph Cooper, Humphrey Burton, James Blades, Fenella Fielding, Nigel Kennedy, Yehudi Menuhin, Steve Race and Malcolm Williamson, among others.
