= Karelia Suite =

Symphonic suite by Jean Sibelius

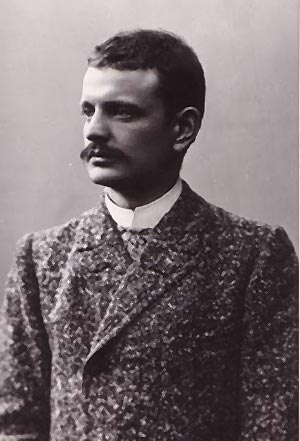
Sibelius photographed in 1891, Vienna.

Karelia Suite, Op. 11 is a subset of pieces from the longer Karelia Music (named after the region of Karelia) written by Jean Sibelius in 1893 for the Viipuri Students' Association and premiered, with Sibelius conducting, at the Imperial Alexander University in Helsinki, Grand Duchy of Finland, on 23 November of that year. Sibelius first conducted the shorter Suite ten days later; it remains one of his most popular works.

Karelia Music was written in the beginning of Sibelius's compositional career, and the complete Music consists of an Overture, 8 Tableaux, and 2 Intermezzi; it runs for about 44 minutes, whereas the Suite lasts about 12 minutes.

The rough-hewn character of the Music was deliberate – the aesthetic intention was not to dazzle with technique but to capture the quality of naive, folk-based authenticity. Historical comments have noted the nationalistic character of the music.

== Orchestration ==
The piece is orchestrated for three flutes (3rd doubling piccolo), three oboes (3rd doubling English horn), two clarinets, two bassoons, four horns in F and E, three trumpets in F and E, three trombones, tuba, timpani, bass drum, cymbals, triangle, tambourine, two sopranos/baritones (Tableau 1), a baritone (Tableau 5), SATB choir (Tableau 8) and strings.

Ralph Wood has commented on the role of the percussion in this composition.

== History ==
"The noise in the hall was like an ocean in a storm. I was at the opposite end of the hall and could not distinguish a single note. The audience did not have the patience to listen and was hardly aware of the music. The orchestra was actually there, behind the pillars. I thrust my way through the crowd and managed to reach the orchestra after a good deal of effort. There were a few listeners. Just a handful."

— Ernst Lampén

The movements in the suite are all borrowed from the Karelia Music, which consisted of an overture and eight tableaux. Sibelius was commissioned to write it in 1893 by Wiipurilainen Osakunta (the Viipuri Students' Association) for a lottery to aid the education of the people of the Viipuri Province. Sibelius conducted the Karelian Music at its premiere on 13 November 1893 at the Imperial Alexander University in Helsinki, Grand Duchy of Finland. The behaviour of the audience was, however, far from ideal. As Sibelius noted later:

You couldn't hear a single note of the music – everyone was on their feet cheering and clapping.

— Jean Sibelius, in a letter to his brother Christian

Ten days later, Sibelius conducted a popular concert that included the Overture, followed by the three movements that would become the Karelia Suite. These four pieces were sold to Edition Fazer in 1899 and, at Sibelius's request, Overture and Karelia Suite were published as Op. 10 & 11, respectively. The rest of the Karelia Music pieces that were yet to be printed ended up in the hands of Breitkopf & Härtel in 1905.

The suite's British premiere occurred on 23 October 1906 at the Promenade Concerts, under the baton of Henry Wood at Queen's Hall.

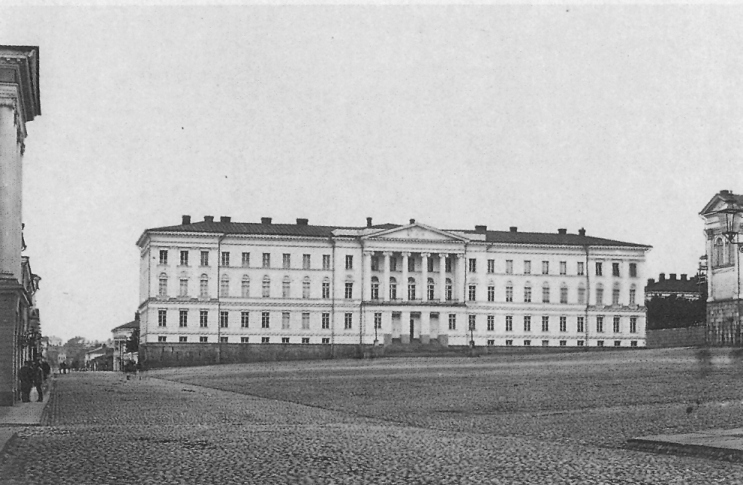
Imperial Alexander University, photographed 1870.

The score was at some point left in the possession of Robert Kajanus and, in 1936, Kajanus's wife Ella returned it back to Sibelius. It is thought that Sibelius burned his eighth symphony along with most of the Karelia Music in August 1945, with only the 1st and 7th tableaux spared from the fire. The viola, cello and double bass parts are also missing from the 1st and 7th tableaux, and the flute parts are completely missing from the 7th tableau.

The Intermezzo from the Karelia Suite was used on British TV from 1956 to 1978 as the theme music for the ITV weekly current affairs programme This Week.

== Composition ==
The original movements are as follows (historical dates in parentheses):

- Overture
- Tableau 1 – A Karelian home. News of War (1293)
- Tableau 2 – The founding of Viipuri Castle
- Tableau 3 – Narimont, the Duke of Lithuania, levying taxes in the province of Käkisalmi (1333)
- Intermezzo (I)
- Tableau 4 – Karl Knutsson in Viipuri Castle (1446)
- Tableau 5 – Pontus De la Gardie at the gates of Käkisalmi (1580)
- Intermezzo (II) (Originally titled Tableau 5 1/2) – Pontus de la Gardie's March)
- Tableau 6 – The Siege of Viipuri (1710)
- Tableau 7 – The Reunion of Old Finland (Karelia) with the rest of Finland (1811)
- Tableau 8 – The Finnish National Anthem

The suite is in three movements:

1. The Intermezzo is the only original movement of the suite. Sibelius borrowed the brass theme in the middle of Tableau 3 and made it into its own movement. The Intermezzo is a jaunty Allegro march-like theme, the orchestra portraying the atmosphere of marching contingents.
2. The Ballade was based on Tableau 4, and is 'sung' by a bard (on cor anglais), reflecting the mood of a fifteenth-century Swedish king, Karl Knutsson, reminiscing in his castle whilst being entertained by a minstrel.
3. Alla Marcia is an exhilarating march, which was originally incidental to Tableau 5½ and is practically the same as the original music, except for some minor chord changes.

=== Completions of the original complete score ===
Most of the music was reconstructed in 1965 by Kalevi Kuosa, from the original parts that had survived. The parts that had not survived were those of the violas, cellos, and double basses. Based on Kuosa's transcription, the Finnish composers Kalevi Aho and Jouni Kaipainen have individually reconstructed the complete music to Karelia Music. A recording of Kalevi Aho's completion was released in 1997 in a recording with the Lahti Symphony Orchestra conducted by Osmo Vänskä, and Jouni Kaipainen's completion was recorded for a 1998 release with the Tampere Philharmonic Orchestra, conducted by Tuomas Ollila.
