= Marie Roze =

French operatic soprano (1846–1926)

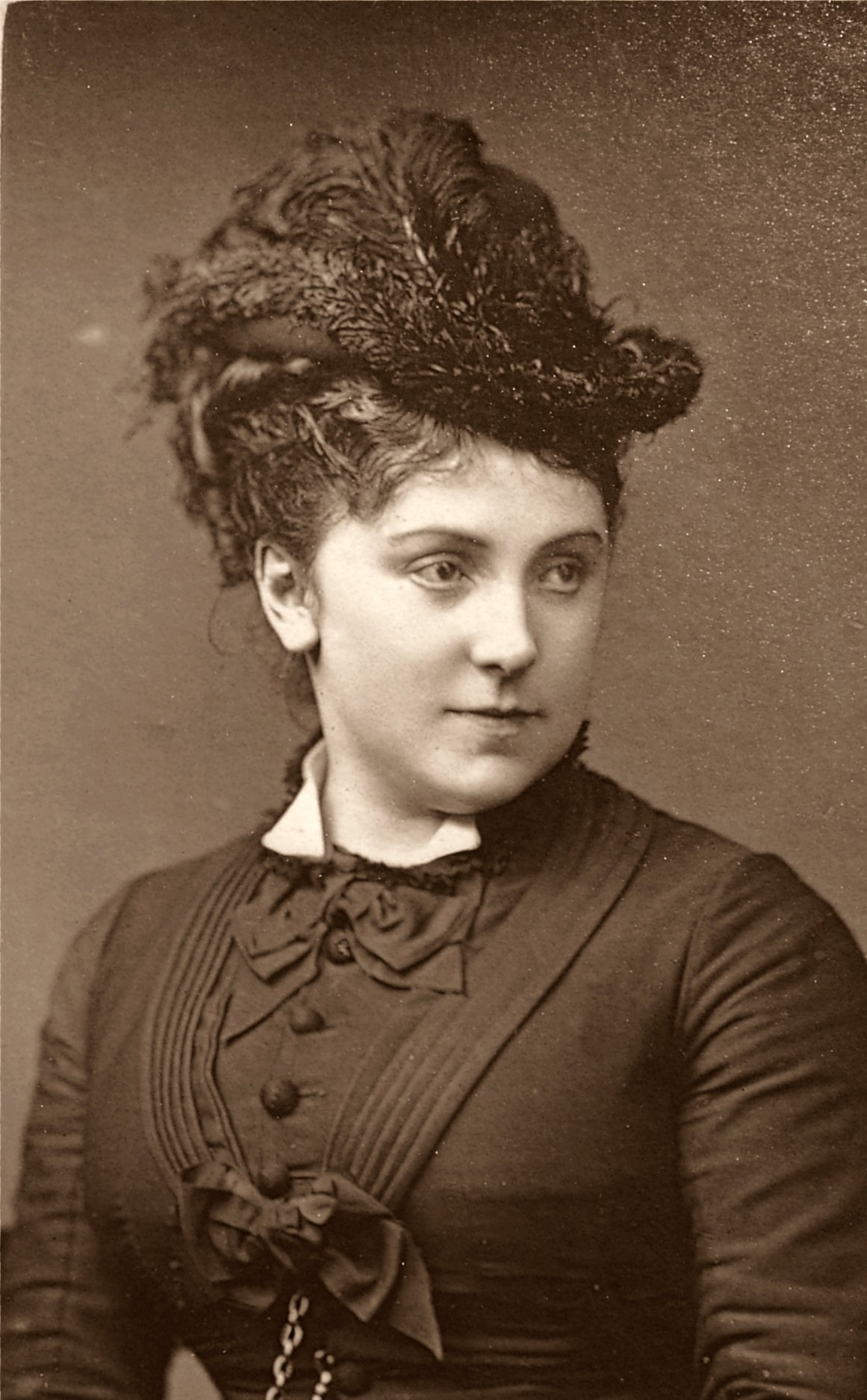

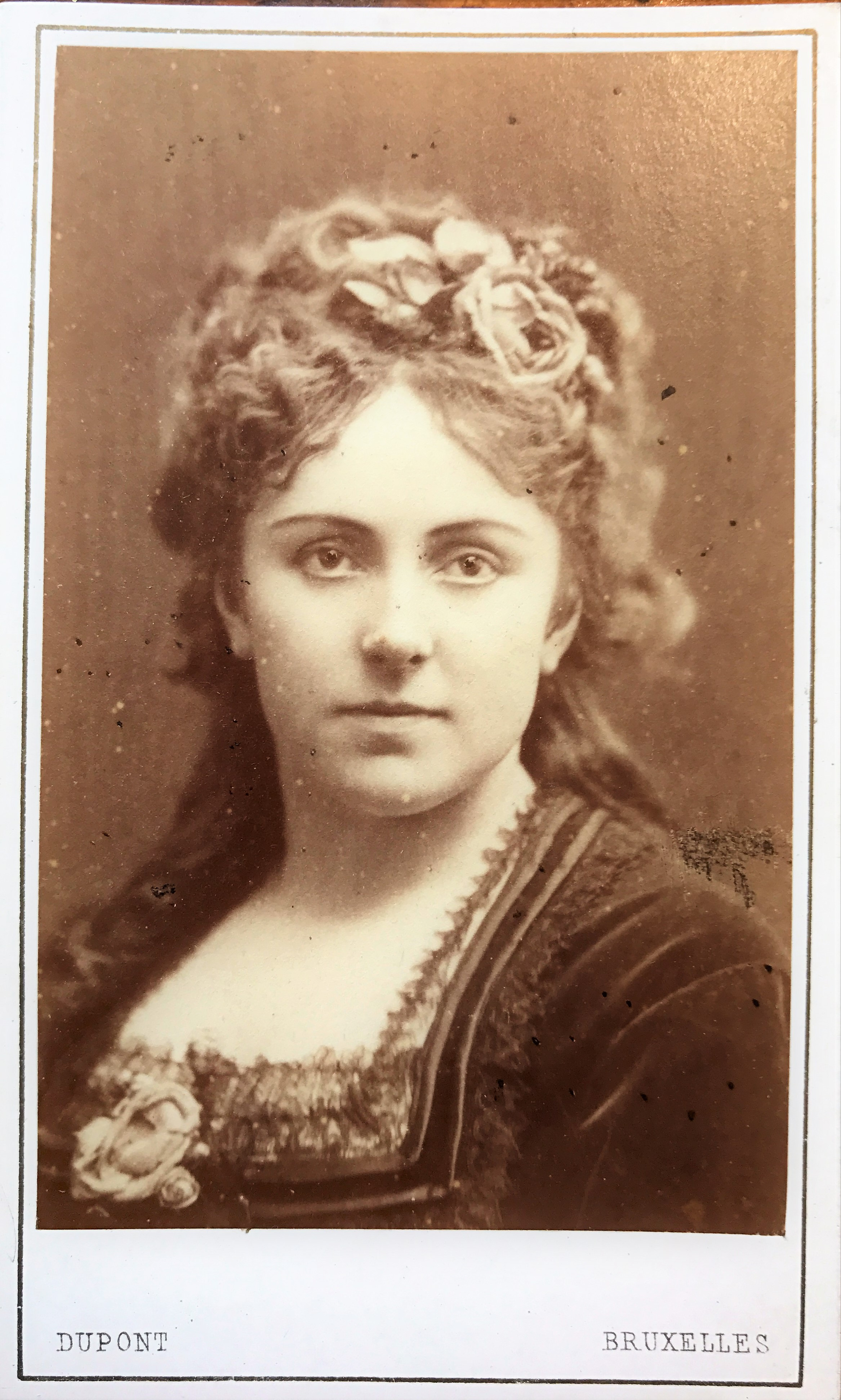
Carte-de-visite Photograph Of French Opera Singer Marie Roze, mid 19th Century

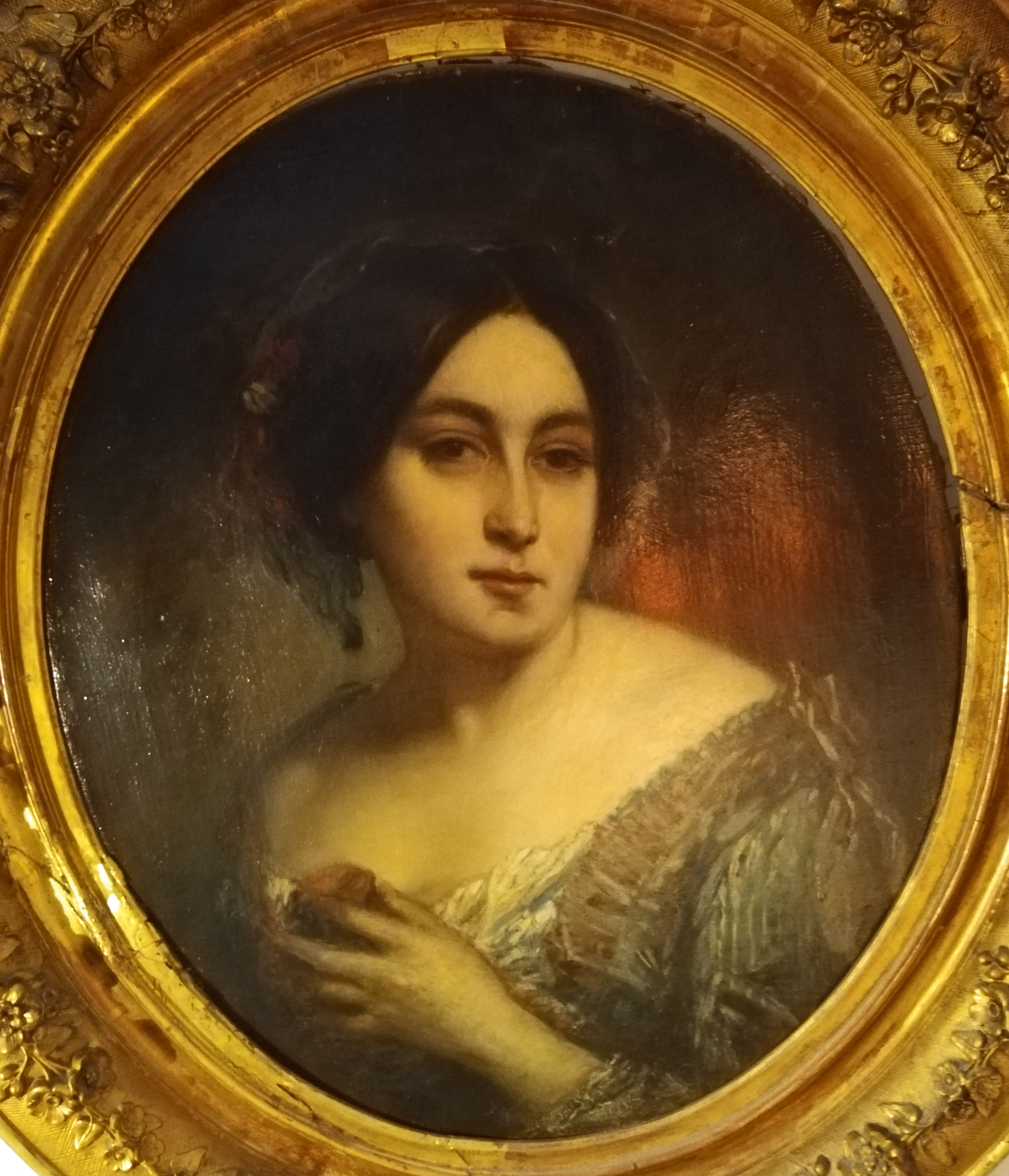
An oil portrait of Marie Roze, circa 1865, attributed to Pierre Paul de Pommayrac

Marie Roze (born Marie Hippolyte Ponsin; 2 March 1846 in Paris – 2 June 1926 in Paris), was a French operatic soprano.

== Early years ==
Roze was born in Paris. At the age of 12, she was sent from France to be educated in England for two years. She then moved back across the Channel to study with Mocker and Auber at the Paris Conservatoire, where she received the first prize in singing in 1865.

== Early career ==
That same year, at the age of 16, she made her debut at the Opéra-Comique. Her success there led to engagements with the Paris Opéra. Bizet wrote the opera Carmen with Marie Roze in mind, but she refused to create the role because she felt it too "scabrous". In early 1875 she sang in Elijah with George Bentham, Antoinette Sterling and Myron W. Whitney at the Royal Albert Hall.

== Career ==
From 1876 she worked with the Carl Rosa Opera Company during their UK tours and in Scotland over a ten-year period. She sang more than a dozen roles ranging from Carmen and Manon to Marguerite. In 1877, she was engaged by the Max Strakosch Opera Company and made her American debut on 8 January 1878 in Philadelphia as Leonora in Donizetti's La favorita.

She later toured the United States with the Carl Rosa Opera Company from 1883 to 1889 and was particularly noted for her interpretation of the title role Bizet's Carmen. In 1890, she set up a music school and taught singing in Paris. She made her farewell tour in 1894.

== Family life ==
Roze was married first to the operatic bass, Julius ("Jule") E. Perkins. Her son Raymond Rôze (1875–1920) was a theatre composer and conductor. He put on a season of opera in English at Covent Garden in the winter of 1913, including his opera Joan of Arc, which was also staged at the Paris Opéra Garnier in 1917. In 1919 he founded the British Symphony Orchestra, with which he gave some concerts and made a few recordings.

Her second husband was Henry, one of the sons of James Henry Mapleson (1830–1901), an impresario in London and New York.

== Awards and honors ==
Roze received multiple medals for her actions during the German invasion of France. At her death, the French government ordered a bust of Marie Roze in her role in Galatea to be erected over her tomb at the Père Lachaise Cemetery, and acquired two of her portraits by Alexis Perignon and Paul Emmanuel de Pommayrac. They hang in the Paris Opera Garnier Library and the Museum of the Philharmonie de Paris.

== Sources ==
- Baltzell, W. J., "Roze, Marie" in Baltzell's Dictionary of Musicians, originally published in 1910, facsimile edition published by Read Books, 2007. ISBN 1-4067-5382-3
- New York Times, "Mme. Marie Roze: Arrival of the New Prima Donna of the Strakosch Company", 31 December 1877.
- New York Times, "Marie Roze as Carmen: An Immense Audience in the Boston Globe Theatre", 11 November 1880.
- Bravo, "Finding the Real Carmen", Fall 2016
