= BSO =

BSO may refer to:

== Science and medicine ==
- Bilateral salpingo-oophorectomy, the surgical removal of both ovaries and both fallopian tubes
- Barents Sea Opening, an gateway to the Arctic Ocean
- British School of Osteopathy, the United Kingdom's oldest osteopathic institution
- Bismuth silicon oxide, a chemical compound that has bismuth, silicon, and oxygen
- Buthionine sulfoximine, a chemical substance inhibiting glutathione synthesis
- Brain storm optimization algorithm
- British Society of Otology, UK professional body
- $\operatorname{BSO}(n)$, Classifying space for orthogonal group
- $\operatorname{BSO}$, Classifying space for infinite orthogonal group

== Music ==
- Baltimore Symphony Orchestra, Maryland, United States
- Beijing Symphony Orchestra, Beijing, China
- Berliner Sinfonie Orchester, Berlin, Germany
- Bloomington Symphony Orchestra (Minnesota), United States
- Bilkent Symphony Orchestra, Ankara, Turkey
- Birmingham Symphony Orchestra, England
- Boston Symphony Orchestra, Massachusetts, United States
- The Brian Setzer Orchestra, a United States band of the late 1990s swing revival
- British Symphony Orchestra, the name of a number of symphonic ensembles since c1905
- Bournemouth Symphony Orchestra, Poole, Dorset, England

== Transport ==
- Basco Airport, Batanes, Philippines
- Basildon railway station, station code

== Other uses ==
- BSO, a European information technology company founded by Eckart Wintzen, now a part of Atos
- Baloch Students Organization, Balochistan, Pakistan
- Bank of Syria and Overseas, Syria
- Basque Statistics Office
- Bicycle shaped object, a cheaply produced, poor quality bicycle sold in mainstream stores
- Basilian Salvatorian Order, a Catholic monastic community in Lebanon
- Black September Organization, a Palestinian militant group
- Brake Standard Open, a designation of British railway carriage
- Broward County Sheriff's Office, Florida, USA
- Österreichische Bundes-Sportorganisation, the Austrian Federal Sports Organization
- Buso language, the language spoken by a tribe in western Chad, by ISO 639 designation
