= Myron W. Whitney =

American opera singer

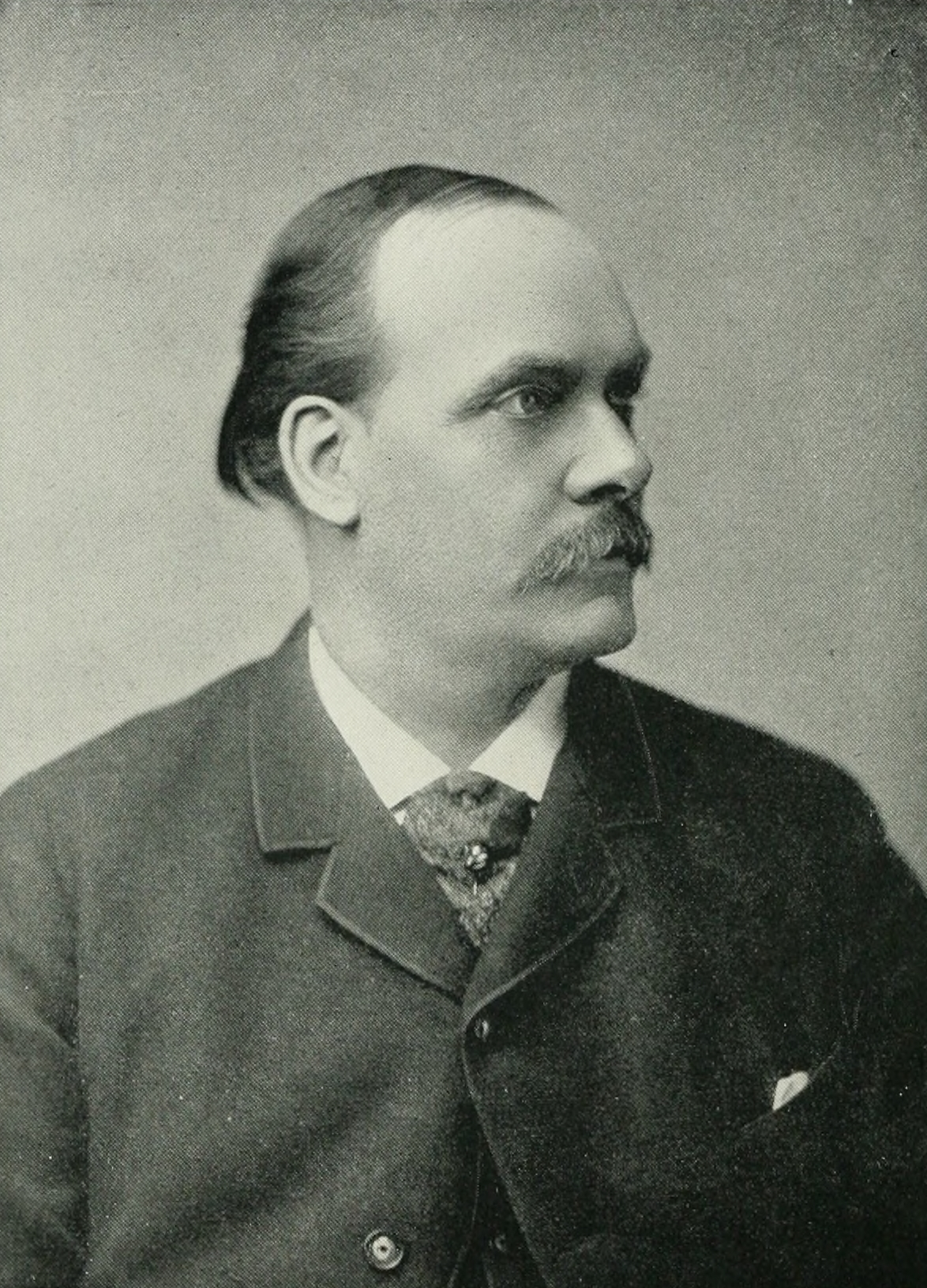
Myron W. Whitney, opera singer

Myron William Whitney (5 September 1836, Ashby, Massachusetts - 18 September 1910, Sandwich, Massachusetts) was an American bass opera singer.

Whitney went to Boston at the age of 16 and made his first appearance there in 1858 at a Christmas performance of the Messiah that was given by the Handel and Haydn Society. After about 10 years of concert singing, he went to Florence, Italy, to study and then to London to become a pupil of Alberto Randegger.

After his studies, Whitney filled various engagements and attracted attention especially by his rendition of the part of Elijah at the Birmingham Festival. In early 1875 he sang in Elijah with Marie Roze, Antoinette Sterling and George Bentham at the Royal Albert Hall. In 1876 he was the principal soloist at the opening exercises of the Centennial Exposition in Philadelphia. After 1876, he sang in the United States, and appeared in nearly all the May festivals held in various cities in the country.

He accompanied Theodore Thomas on two tours and was part of his American Opera Company. For several years, he was a member of the Boston Ideal Opera Company. He possessed a bass voice of nearly three octaves compass, and was especially noted as an oratorio singer.

He had three children with Eleanor Breasha, whom he married in 1859. He retired in 1890.
