= British Symphony Orchestra =

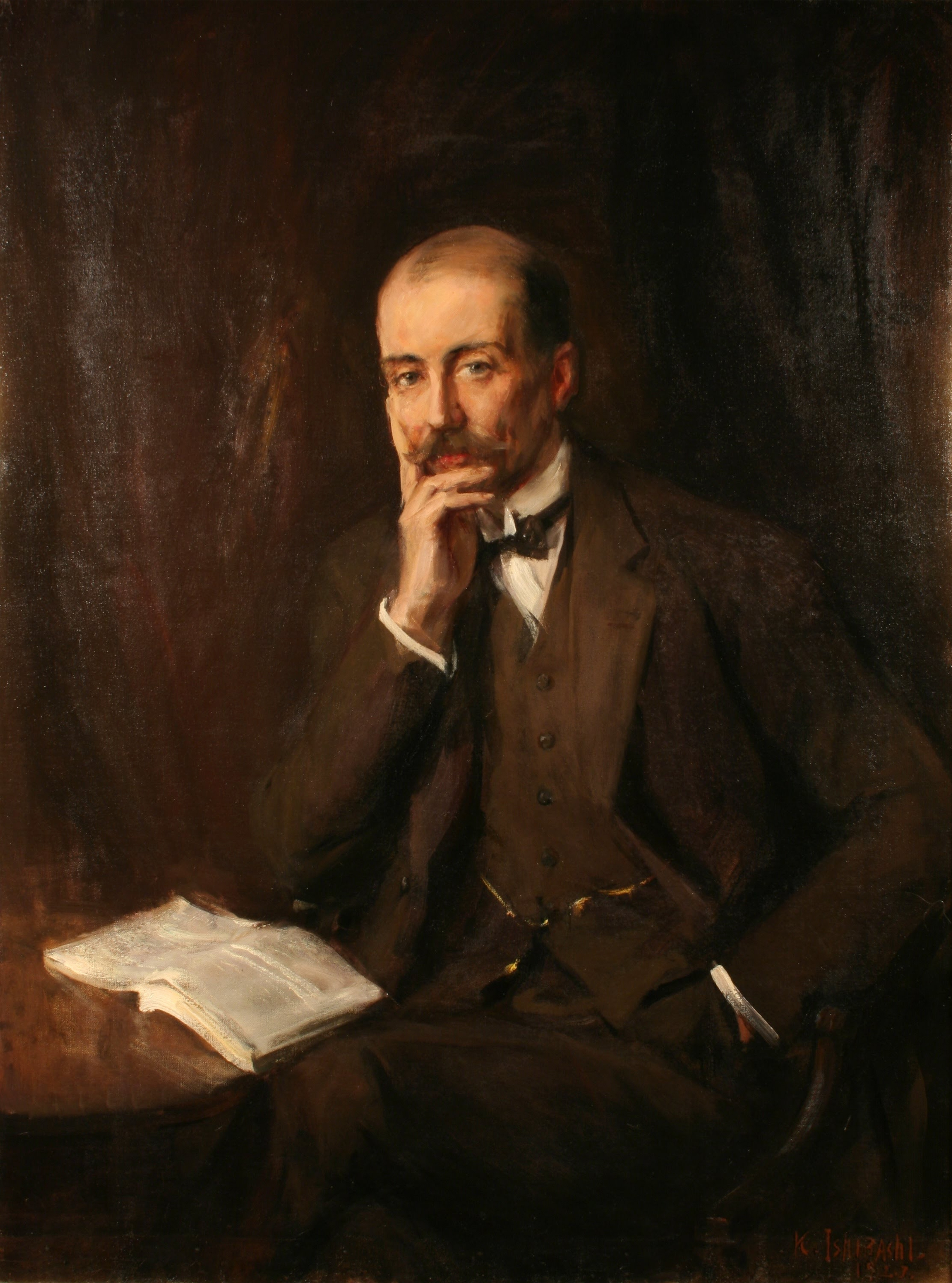
Adrian Boult, conductor of the British Symphony Orchestra 1920–1923, by Ishibashi Kazunori (1923)

The British Symphony Orchestra (BSO or BrSO) is the name of a number of symphony orchestras, active in both concert halls and recording studios, which have existed at various times in Britain since c1905 until the present day. (Note: There is currently (2019) no single work dealing with the various incarnations of the orchestra. Much of the original information for this article comes from the pages of The Musical Times, whose archive is currently on JSTOR, with restricted access. The following notes attempt to give a flavour of the more detailed reviews, over and above the plain record of performers and works played.)

There were gaps of several years when the orchestra's name disappeared from the public view (see § Historical overview). The various orchestras were only active for about fifteen years between 1905 and 1939, and more recently, since 1989.

The conductors of the orchestra's first incarnation from 1905 included William Sewell, Julian Clifford senior and Hamilton Harty. After World War I Raymond Rôze reformed the orchestra as a properly-constituted, full-time body of musicians. Rôze died unexpectedly in 1920 and was succeeded as chief conductor by Adrian Boult, who gave numerous public concerts over several years. Other musicians conducting the orchestras at the time included Samuel Coleridge-Taylor, Franco Leoni, Ralph Vaughan Williams, and Edward Elgar. Members of the orchestra during this period included Albert Sammons and § Frederick Holding as leaders, and Eugene Cruft on bass.

In the early 1930s the name 'British Symphony Orchestra' appeared on the label of many recordings by the Columbia Graphophone Company as a cover name or pseudonym for the orchestra of the Royal Philharmonic Society. Conductors during this period include Ethel Smyth, Oskar Fried, Bruno Walter, Felix Weingartner, and Henry Wood. A few public concerts were given in London with an orchestra of this name during the years leading up to the Second World War.

More recently, the music for the 1989 film La Révolution française was composed and conducted by Georges Delerue, and played by the British Symphony Orchestra. Since 2016 an orchestra of the same name founded by Philip Mackenzie has made a number of concert appearances in Britain, and also toured in China.

== Historical overview ==
The history of the various British Symphony Orchestras seems to fall into five approximate periods.

1. 1905–1910: Formed by the organist, conductor, and composer William Sewell in around 1905, and active in London concert halls for about five years until c1910. There seem to be no extant recordings.
2. 1919–1923: Formed in summer 1919 by Raymond Rôze for professional musicians who served in the Army during WW1. He made their first recording in around 1919. Rôze died aged about 45 in March 1920. The orchestra continued to give concerts in London mainly under Adrian Boult, who also made his first recordings with this ensemble. They seem to have given few public concerts after about 1923.
3. 1930–1932: Recording orchestra. From 1930 to 1932, the name in general only appears on record labels, albeit with a number of well-known conductors such as Felix Weingartner, Bruno Walter and soloists like Joseph Szigeti. The orchestral musicians involved may have had more permanent jobs with other orchestras, and the name 'British Symphony Orchestra' may have been used to avoid contractual obligations.
4. 1934–1939: A few public concerts in 1934–5 and 1939 were given with a British Symphony Orchestra. There seem to be no recordings from this period.
5. Recent formations:
  1. 1989: The music for the 1989 film La Révolution française, composed and conducted by Georges Delerue, was played by the British Symphony Orchestra, an ensemble of freelance musicians assembled for just this task.
  2. 2004: A British Symphony Orchestra played at an extravagant wedding in India for two sons of Subrata Roy.
  3. 2016: Formed by Philip Mackenzie with freelance musicians. It has performed as a backing orchestra for Never the Bride, and with ABBA and Elton John tribute bands. The orchestra made a classical concert tour in China in 2017–18.

For orchestras with a similar name or initials, see also § Disambiguation

== First formation: 1905 – c. 1910 ==
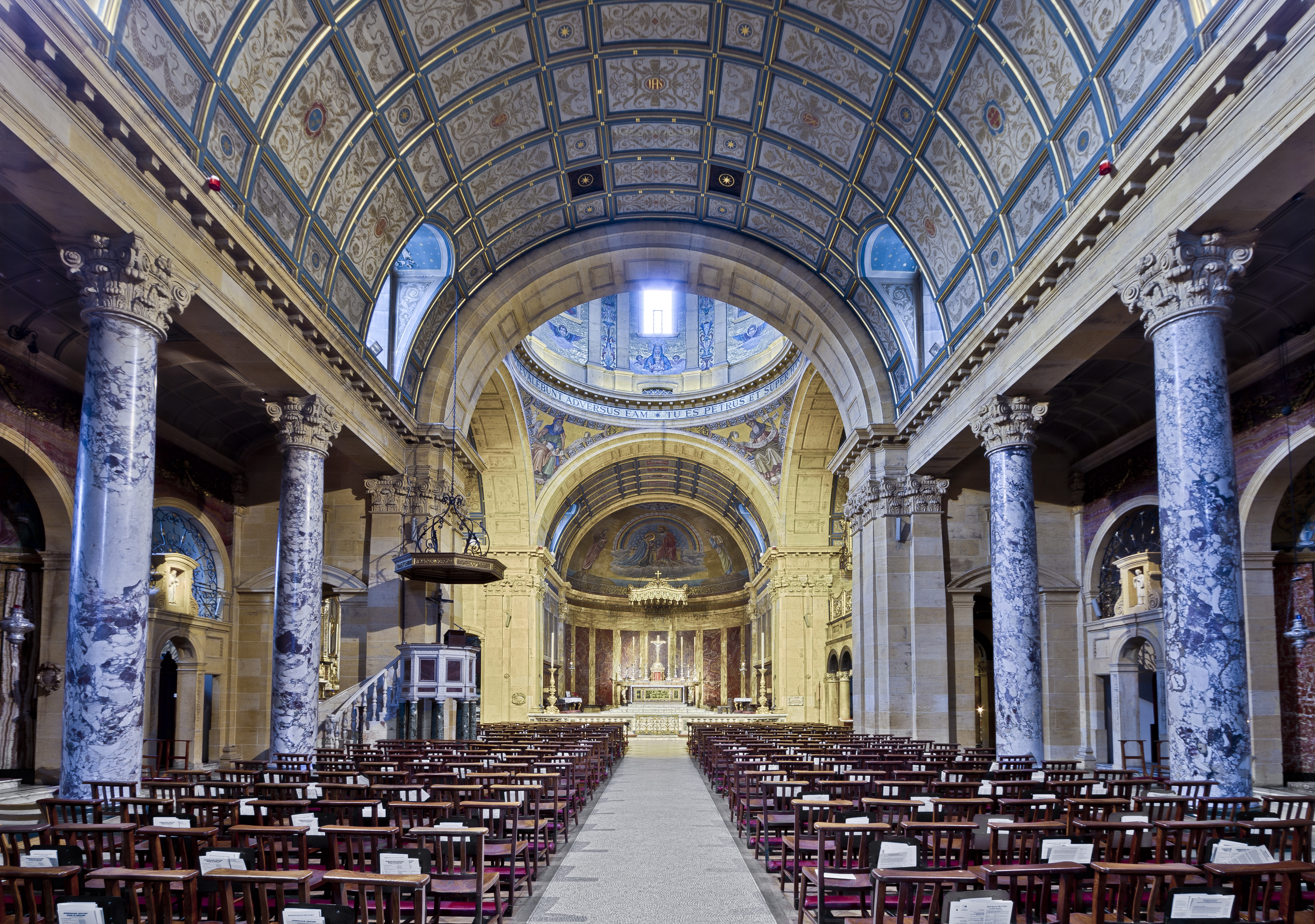
Nave of the Birmingham Oratory (1907–1910), church of a community of the Oratory of Saint Philip Neri, founded in 1848 by Ernest Newman

In October 1905 William Sewell, (Note: Sewell wrote the incidental music for The Cost of a Crown by Robert H. Benson, performed in 1908 for the centenary of St. Cuthbert's College, Ushaw.) organist at the Birmingham Oratory, director of the Midland Gleemen (Note: Birmingham concert, 29 December 1907, including unaccompanied partsongs: "Music in Birmingham". The Musical Times. 49 (780): 112. 1 February 1908. "The Midland Gleemen, formerly known as Mr. William Sewell's Male-voice Choir..." Sewell conducted Cherubini's Requiem Mass No. 2 for Male chorus in Birmingham in 1909: "Music in Birmingham". The Musical Times. 50 (793): 186. 1 March 1909. JSTOR 905475.) and later sub-organist of Westminster Cathedral, placed an advertisement in The Musical Times:

"The British Symphony Orchestra (conductor, Mr. W. Sewell) is a new combination of orchestral players which seeks for public favour."

One of the newly-formed British Symphony Orchestra's first concerts took place at the Æolian Hall, London, on 7 December 1905. The Irish violinist Rohan Clensy (Note: A multi-talented artist, actor of both stage and film, violinist, and singer who died in France in February 1919 as a corporal in the Military Police Corps. He is commemorated in the last line of the War Memorial in the Theatre Royal, Haymarket. He sang in Mozart's Der Schauspieldirektor in 1910, as part of Thomas Beecham's wildly extravagant opera season. This was part of a double bill including G. H. Clutsam's A Summer Night.) who had studied with Eugène Ysaÿe, played Max Bruch's Violin Concerto No. 2. The Standard's critic thought that Clensy was "a clever and thoughtful artist, whose playing shows intelligence and taste. His performance [...] was, on the whole, artistic. The phrasing was clear, and the execution facile, but there was sometimes need of more life and passion, and the tone was somewhat cold. The orchestra gave him good support, and their playing of Schubert's overture. Alfonso und Estrella, an attractive work, which is not often heard, was virile and effective." The programme also included Bach's Suite No. 3 in D and Grieg's Norwegian Dances.

On 18 December 1905 Sewell conducted the BSO with Maria Sequel (Note: She had played the Mozart A major concerto at a Prom in October 1904 with Henry Wood.) in Mendelssohn's G minor piano concerto. The music critic of The Standard noted that in the orchestra's playing "there were some rough places, however, which doubtless will become smooth with more practice and experience in their performance of the Figaro and Hebrides overtures."

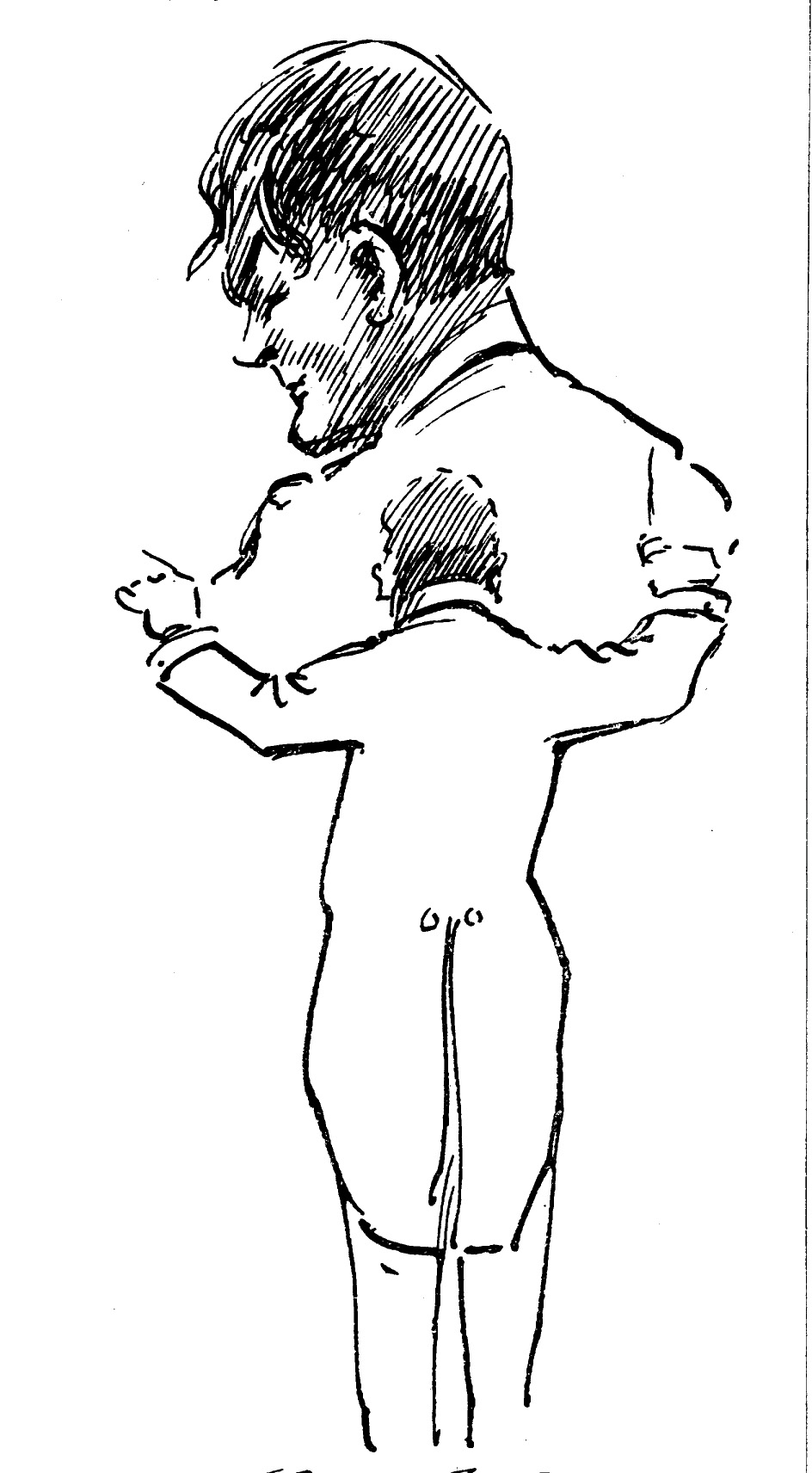
Harty sketched by a member of the Hallé Orchestra, c1920

Again at Aeolian Hall, on February 16, 1906, Lucia Fydell (Note: Lucia Fydell was the great-granddaughter of John Braham, composer of "The Death of Nelson". She had been completing her studies with Jacques Bouhy in Paris, and reappeared in London at the Aeolian Hall in February 1906.) and Atherton Smith (Note: Dean-Myatt, William (compiler) (2013). A Scottish vernacular discography, 1888–1960 (PDF). (Online at the National Library of Scotland). Hailsham, Sussex: City of London Phonograph and Gramophone Society. Atherton Smith was a Scottish baritone, b. Glasgow 1874, who made some records for Zonophone and Odeon records c1904.) with the British Symphony Orchestra conducted by Sewell, gave a recital consisting chiefly of excerpts from Saint-Saëns's Samson and Delilah. "Miss Fydell has a powerful voice and dramatic perception, but she would be heard to greater advantage on the stage than in the concert-room."

The agents for the British Symphony Orchestra in March 1906 were Concert-Direction Limited, originally founded in August 1905 with Louis and Laurence Cowen as directors. It changed its name in July 1906 to Vert and Sinkins Concert-Direction Limited in 1906. Fernando Vert was the brother of Narciso Vert, whose musical agency later became known as Ibbs and Tillett.

Hamilton Harty who, like William Sewell, had been a church organist (in County Down) conducted what seems to be his first London orchestral concert on 5 April 1906, with the British Symphony Orchestra at the Queen's Hall. Winifred Christie played César Franck's Symphonic Variations and Saint-Saëns' Piano Concerto No. 2.

On 7 April fr:Louis Abbiate played Widor's 'cello concerto and Adrien-François Servais' Concerto Militaire (works of "small musical value today"), with Julian Clifford senior, who "conducted with conspicuous skill".

Two more concerts followed, one at the Queen's Hall on 21 April, and on 24 May 1906 at the Aeolian Hall.

=== National Sunday League concerts ===
The orchestra appeared at a number of concerts organised by the National Sunday League, which was opposed to sabbatarianism, and promoted rational recreation on Sundays.

The light soprano Isabel Jay appeared with the BSO at the Alhambra Theatre of Variety on 7 April 1906. (Note: Isabel Jay opened in The Girl Behind the Counter on 21 April 1906. The musical farce ran for 141 performances. In 1906 she also appeared in Liza Lehmann's comic opera The Vicar of Wakefield, with a libretto by Laurence Housman.) Harty conducted again on 21 October 1906 at the Queen's Hall, with Edith Kirkwood and Gertrude Lonsdale singing. (Note: The full programme included Mozart: Overture The Magic Flute; Hamish MacCunn: Ballad Overture Dowiedens o' Jarrow; Gounod: Waltz Song (Roméo et Juliette); Hamilton Harty: Symphony in D (Irish); Michele Esposito: Poem (first performance in England); Tchaikovsky: Capriccio Italien; Granville Bantock: Song of the Genie; Frederic Cowen: Four English Dances; Weber: Overture Oberon.)

On 30 November 1907 the British Symphony Orchestra appeared at The Crystal Palace in a concert including Harty's own Ode to a Nightingale sung by Agnes Nicholls (his wife), and Julius Tausch's Concerto (actually March and Polonaise) for six timpani: the soloist was Gabriel Cleather, "who became a very busy man during the performance".

=== Amalgamated Musicians' Union concerts ===
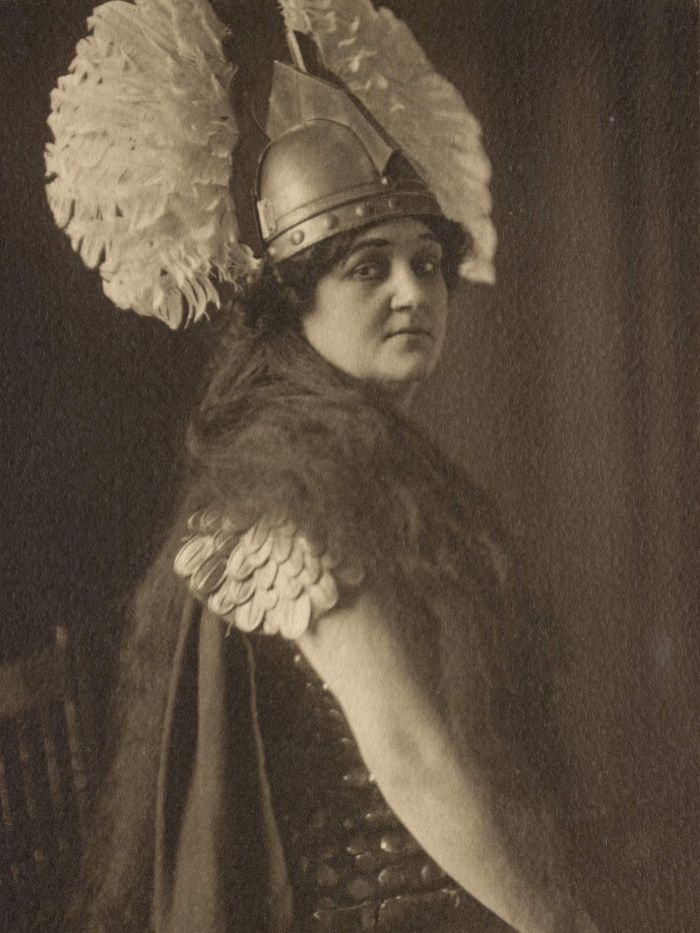
Perceval Allen as Brünnhilde in 1913. She also made the first recordings of Richard Strauss's Elektra.

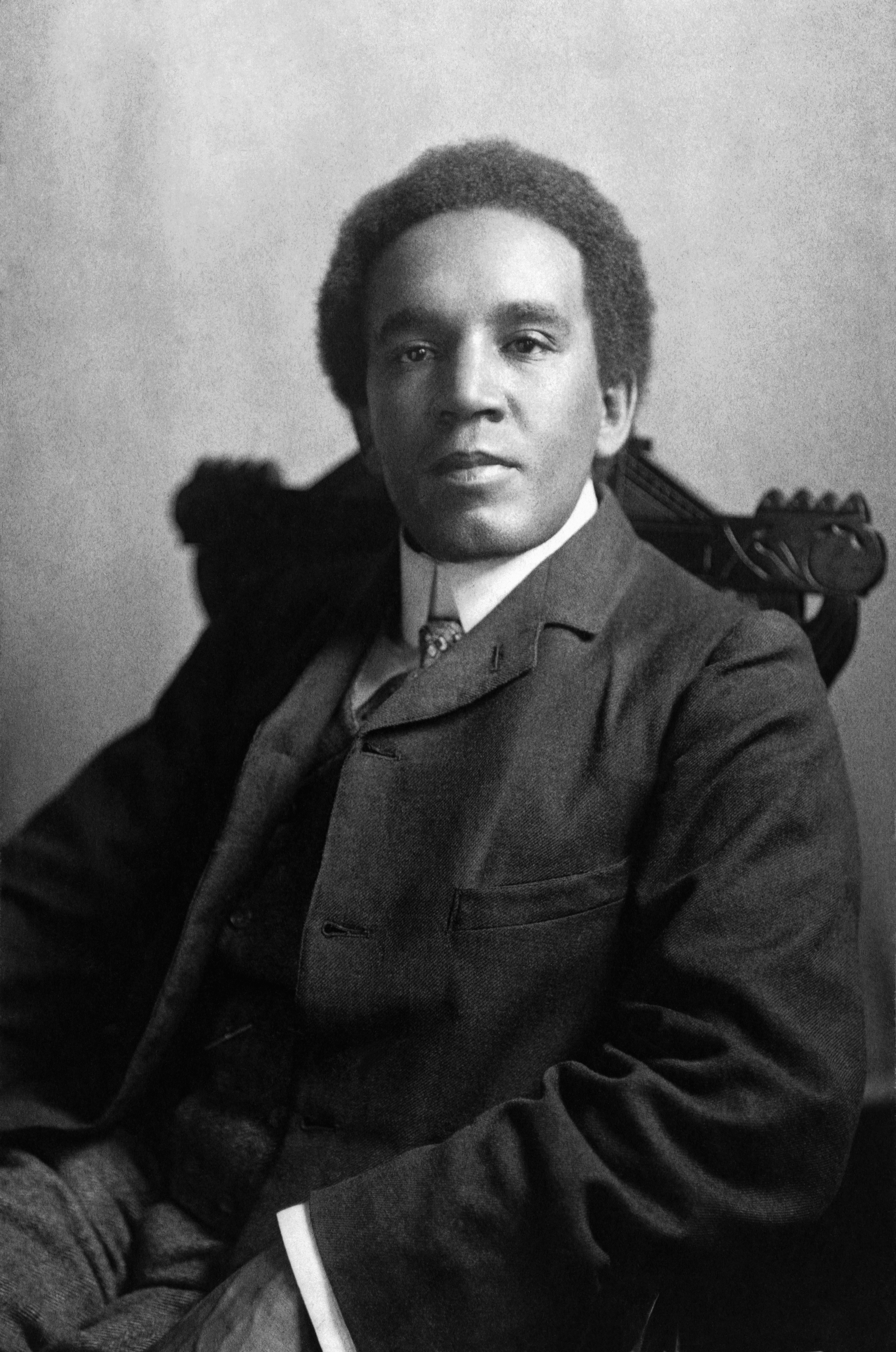
Samuel Coleridge-Taylor in 1905

According to John Lucas, the British Symphony Orchestra was "formed in 1908 by the Amalgamated Musicians' Union to provide work for its members on Sundays." Albert Sammons, the leader, also played in the restaurant band at the Waldorf Hotel, where Thomas Beecham recruited the 23 year-old for his new Beecham Symphony Orchestra.

The second concert on 4 October was reviewed in The Standard:

"The second of a series of concerts organised by Mr. Oswald Stoll and the Amalgamated Musicians' Union—the profits of which are given to the benevolent funds of this society—was given last evening at the London Coliseum. (Note: The Coliseum was built by Stoll in 1904, the largest capacity theatre in London.) The programme was furnished by the British Symphony Orchestra, consisting of l00 instrumentalists, the vocalists being Miss Perceval Allen and Mr. Lloyd Chandos, (Note: London-born tenor, made a number of records for Odeon. A test pressing of him singing Massenet in c1931 aged around 70 is quite affecting.) the conductors Messrs. J. M. Glover and J. Skuse. (Note: Joseph Skuse, of Cricklewood, sub-conductor of the orchestra at the Theatre Royal, Drury Lane.) An exceptionally large audience was present."

On 18 October the vocalists were Kitty Gordon, William Green and Maria Yelland, 'The Cornish Contralto'. The conductors were Joseph Skuse and Leonard Chalk. (Note: Chalk composed and conducted the music for a 1905 production of Henry V at the Imperial Theatre, which was pulled down in 1908 to make way for the Central Hall, Westminster where a later 'British Symphony Orchestra' made recordings for the Columbia Graphophone Company in the early 1930s. See also British Symphony Orchestra discography.)

Two more Musicians' Union Sunday evening concerts took place on 4 and 18 April 1909 at the Coliseum. The British Symphony Orchestra, led by Albert Sammons, was conducted by Alick Maclean and Joseph Skuse.

The great success of the Sunday evening concerts initiated by the Amalgamated Musicians' Union at the Coliseum two years ago has induced the union to undertake a similar series of concerts at Queen's Hall. Beginning on 4 September 1910, Mr. Samuel Coleridge-Taylor will conduct his Hiawatha's Wedding Feast with the British Symphony Orchestra and Choir. During the season, which extends to June, 1911, many interesting and novel works are to be produced by the orchestra and choir, [...] and some of the best conductors will share the responsibility of directing the different works.

According to Lucas, Beecham conducted two Musicians' Union concerts with the British Symphony Orchestra in 1910. One took place on Sunday 3 April 1910, with the contralto Carmen Hill.

On 18 September 1910 at Queens Hall, Franco Leoni's dramatic cantata, The Gate of Life conducted by the composer, was performed by Mme. Ada Davies, Giuseppe Lenghi-Cellini, and Wilfrid Douthitt with the British Symphony Orchestra and Choir.

== Second formation: 1919–1923 ==
=== Background ===
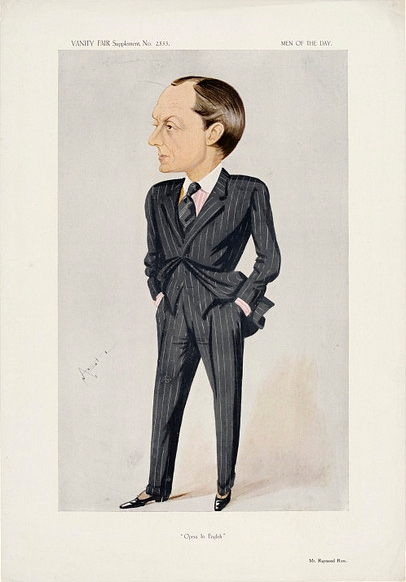
Raymond Rôze caricatured by "Astz" in Vanity Fair in December 1913; caption reads "Opera in English"

After the end of WW1 a second British Symphony Orchestra was formed in 1919 by the theatre composer and conductor Raymond Rôze. The personnel were all de-mobbed soldiers, many of whom had served abroad in the Army, and who had all been professional musicians before the war, some of them established soloists.

This was not his first experience with military affairs: just a few weeks before the war broke out in 1914, Rôze had organised the London Arts Corps (or sometimes United Arts Force) (later the 1st Battalion, County of London Volunteer Regiment (United Arts Rifles). This was a civilian volunteer Home Defence battalion consisting entirely of musicians, writers and artists who for various reasons did not wish to join the regular or Territorial Army. The roll-call of those involved reads like a Who's Who of the artistic, musical and literary world, headed up by Sir Arthur Pinero as chairman, Lord Desborough, Gerald du Maurier, Sir Herbert Beerbohm Tree and many others. There was a distinguished list of naval and military patrons, such as Major-General Sir Alfred Turner, and possibly including some of the later patrons of the British Symphony Orchestra. (Note: Other members of the committee included Sir Edward Elgar, Sir Hubert Parry, Sir Thomas Brock, Sir Edward Poynter, Sir George Frampton, Cyril Maude, and Dion Boucicault. Also actively involved were painters like Sir John Lavery, Sir George Frampton, Lieut.-Col. Solomon J. Solomon, Sir Frank Short, Bernard Partridge and Arthur Hacker; Derwent Wood, George Lambert and others of the Chelsea Arts Club platoon. Actors: Sir F. R. Benson, Arthur Bourchier, Allen Aynesworth, Godfrey Tearle, Nelson Keys, Huntley Wright and his brother Fred, musicians and singers like Thomas Dunhill, Harry Plunket Greene, Dalhousie Young (1866–1921), the conductor C. H. Allen Gill; poets like Emile Cammaerts; novelists like Arthur Applin, Temple Thurston and Keble Howard et al.)

Rôze also supplied the battalion with several hundred modern .303 Martini–Enfield carbines and 10,000 rounds of ammunition purchased on his own responsibility, to replace the practice weapons (described as "neolithic flintlocks") normally issued by the War Department. The corps gradually became an official Army volunteer battalion, and Rôze resigned as Hon. Secretary in January 1915.

During the war, the promising young baritone Charles Mott (who had sung in Rôze's opera Joan of Arc) was called up c1917, joined the Artists' Rifles (a different battalion) and was killed in 1918 at the Third Battle of the Aisne.

=== 1919 ===
At the time of its founding in summer 1919, it was the only permanent London orchestra apart from the London Symphony Orchestra, which was founded in 1904 by disgruntled players from the Queen's Hall orchestra.

The orchestra under Rôze gave a Royal Command Performance at Buckingham Palace for George V and Queen Mary. The concert included Reels and Strathspeys for strings and wind by Joseph Holbrooke and Rôze's overture to his incidental music for Julius Caesar.

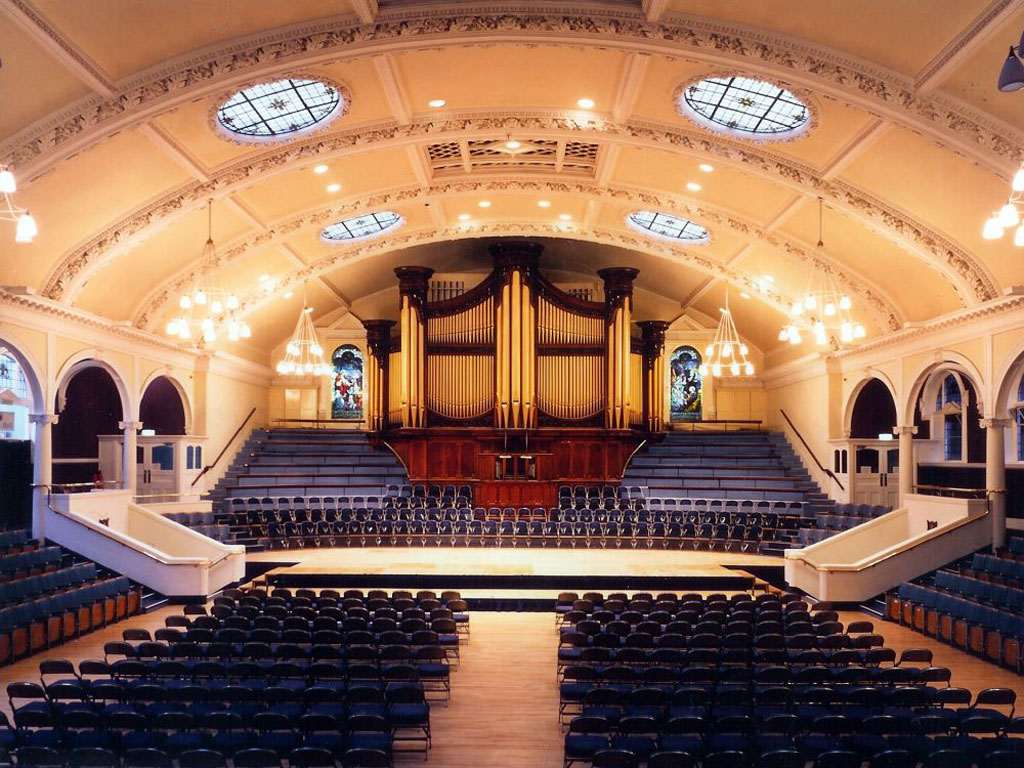
The Albert Hall, Nottingham

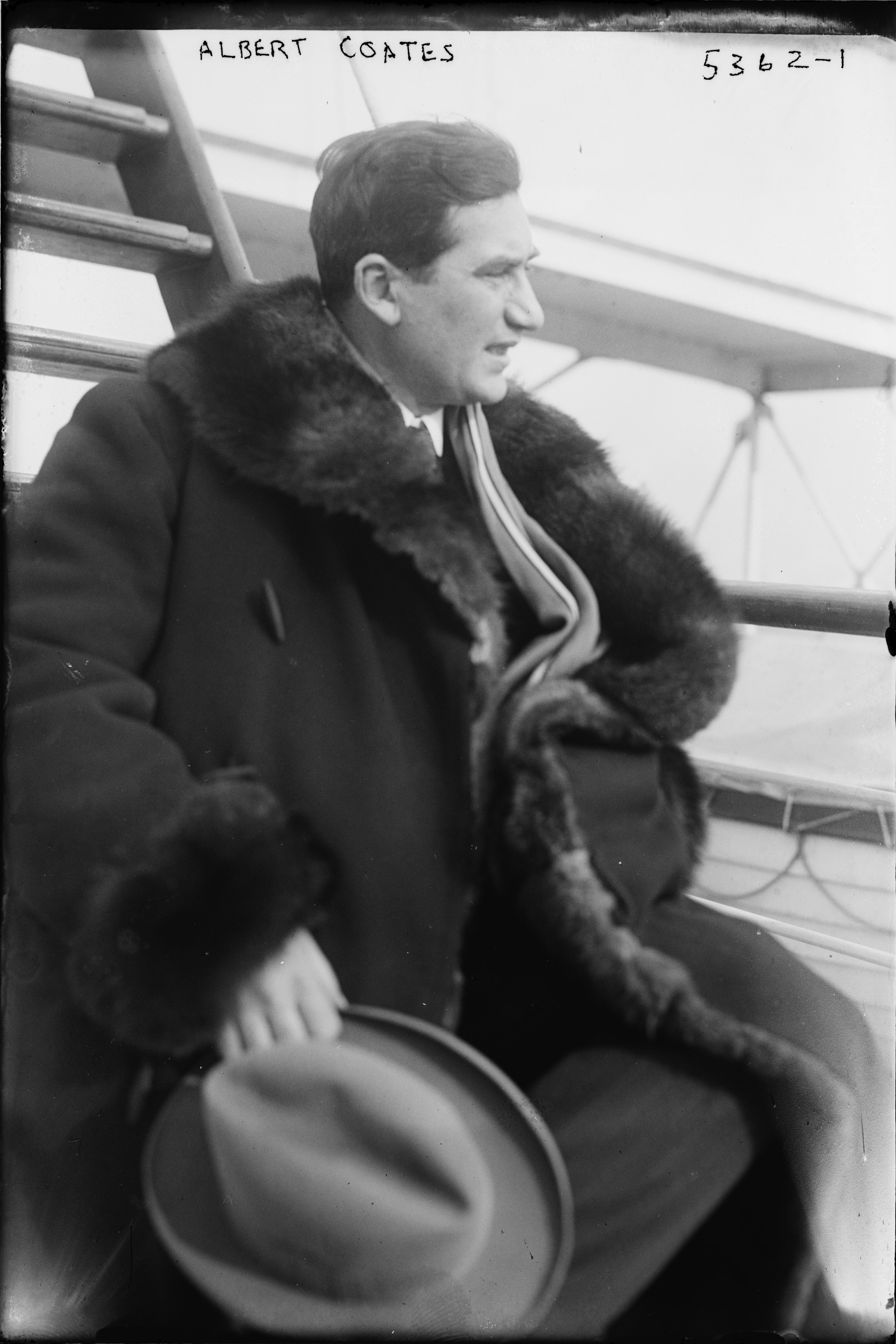
Albert Coates, who conducted a concert in 1919

Rôze conducted the orchestra's first public concert at the Royal Albert Hall on 21 September. The London critic of The Musical Times remarked on the familiar faces on the platform:

"The words 'first appearance,' however, read oddly in connection with a band largely made up of players whose names are well known to London audiences, some of them soloists. The 'British Symphony Orchestra' begins by claiming attention on the ground that all its members have served in the Army, mostly abroad, but it should soon take a prominent position on its musical merits. Mr. Raymond Rose [sic] conducted, and Mr. Tom Burke sang.

The orchestra, again conducted by Rôze, gave a programme in the Albert Hall, Nottingham on 4 December 1919, "embracing Rossini's ever-green William Tell overture, Grieg's Peer Gynt Suite, and the third movement of Tchaikovsky's 'Pathétique' symphony." Katharine Goodson (piano), Watkin Mills (baritone), and Bronisław Huberman (violin), were "cordially appreciated. M. Paul Frenkel (Note: Frenkel made some recordings with Huberman, including Paganini, Bach and Lalo.) acted as accompanist."

Another concert took place on 12 December 1919, with Tchaikovsky's sixth symphony, two Passacaglias by Cyril Scott who also conducted, plus Scott's Idyllic Phantasy for voice, oboe and cello, (performed by Astra Desmond, Arthur Foreman (Note: Rec. of Arthur Foreman playing Schumann Romance No. 1. The other side is by Arthur Brooke, an English oboist who played in another BSO. See also Brooke's Method and Brief bio) and Cedric Sharpe respectively). (Note: The notice by Alfred Kalisch in The Musical Times says it was for piano rather than cello.) "[The orchestra] has been heard by the King and Queen; it has a very strong list of naval and military patrons; and is a first-class orchestra, the tone of the strings being particularly full and rich, and the wood-wind conspicuously mellow."

On 27 December 1919, the BSO appeared at the Royal Albert Hall with Albert Coates conducting a piano concerto with Leopold Godowsky, and the tenor Clarence Whitehill accompanied by Harold Craxton.

=== 1920 ===
Raymond Rôze was too ill to conduct a BSO concert on 10 February 1920, and Frank Bridge stepped in. Albert Sammons played Rôze's Poem of Victory for violin, and Joseph Holbrooke conducted his own early work, The Viking.

However, the series of concerts of the British Symphony Orchestra had to be abandoned owing to lack of support. Rôze's final concert with the orchestra took place at the Queen's Hall on 23 February 1920. The players "gave an excellent performance of Hubert Bath's symphonic poem The Vision of Hannele [1913], perhaps the best of his more ambitious works." The concert also included Two Dances by Dorothy Howell.

Rôze, the orchestra's founder, died suddenly on 30 March 1920 aged around 45, and Adrian Boult, as his "fortunate successor", became chief conductor.

==== Quinlan Symphony Concerts ====
Thomas Quinlan in a monochrome photograph

The impresario Thomas Quinlan organised a series of twelve "super-concerts" at Kingsway Hall from October 1920 to January 1921, featuring various orchestras, including the Quinlan Orchestra, and the British Symphony Orchestra conducted by Boult, Saturday afternoons at 2.45. According to Boult, this was possibly the first time orchestral music had been heard in the hall, originally built in 1912 as a Methodist place of worship.

The first concert included Bach Brandenburg Concerto No. 3; Vladimir Rosing ("...'the blind Russian tenor', as somebody in the hall called him – a description which all who have seen him sing will understand") sang Tchaikovsky's 'Lensky's Farewell' and other things "in his usual intense manner", and Madame Renée Clement played Édouard Lalo's Violin Concerto No. 1 in F. The concert closed with Tchaikovsky's 5th Symphony.

The second of the Quinlan Concerts in October/November included the tenor Joseph Hislop and the violinist Jacques Thibaud. The programme contained notes by Edwin Evans.

Arnold Bax's tone-poem The Garden of Fand received its British première on 11 December. (Note: "In a short interview with Eamonn Andrews broadcast on Irish radio in 1947, Bax cited this work as his favorite of his own compositions, and it was the last piece of his own music that he heard, as Fand was used to close a concert in Dublin just four days before the composer's death.) Guilhermina Suggia also played Saint-Saëns's Cello Concerto No. 1. The London music critic of The Musical Times, Alfred Kalisch, was disapproving of Suggia's somewhat demonstrative style of playing.

=== 1921 ===
Moriz Rosenthal played the Chopin Piano Concerto in E minor with the BSO at the Kingsway Hall on Saturday, 15 January 1921. The concert included Vaughan Williams's London Symphony, and Miriam Licette sang.

As part of the Oxford Subscription Concerts, the BSO conducted by Boult gave an orchestral concert on 20 January 1921. At a concert of the British Symphony Orchestra on 5 February, Boult revived John Ireland's The Forgotten Rite.

The Quinlan Concerts at the Kingsway Hall came to an end in March 1921 when their promoter was declared bankrupt.

Bach's St Matthew Passion was performed in Westminster Abbey by the Westminster Abbey Special Choir, with the British Symphony Orchestra, on Monday, March 14, 1921.

The British Musical Society, founded in 1917, gave two concerts in June at the Queen's Hall with the British Symphony Orchestra. At the first, Sir Eugene Goossens and Boult conducted an all-British concert on 14 June 1921: Joseph Holbrooke – Overture to The Children; Ralph Vaughan Williams – The Lark Ascending; Sir Eugene Goossens – symphonic poem The Eternal Rhythm; Cyril Scott – Piano Concerto (the composer at the pianoforte); and Gustav Holst's The Planets. This concert included the first performance of the orchestral version of The Lark Ascending, played by Marie Hall who owned a Viotti Stradivarius.

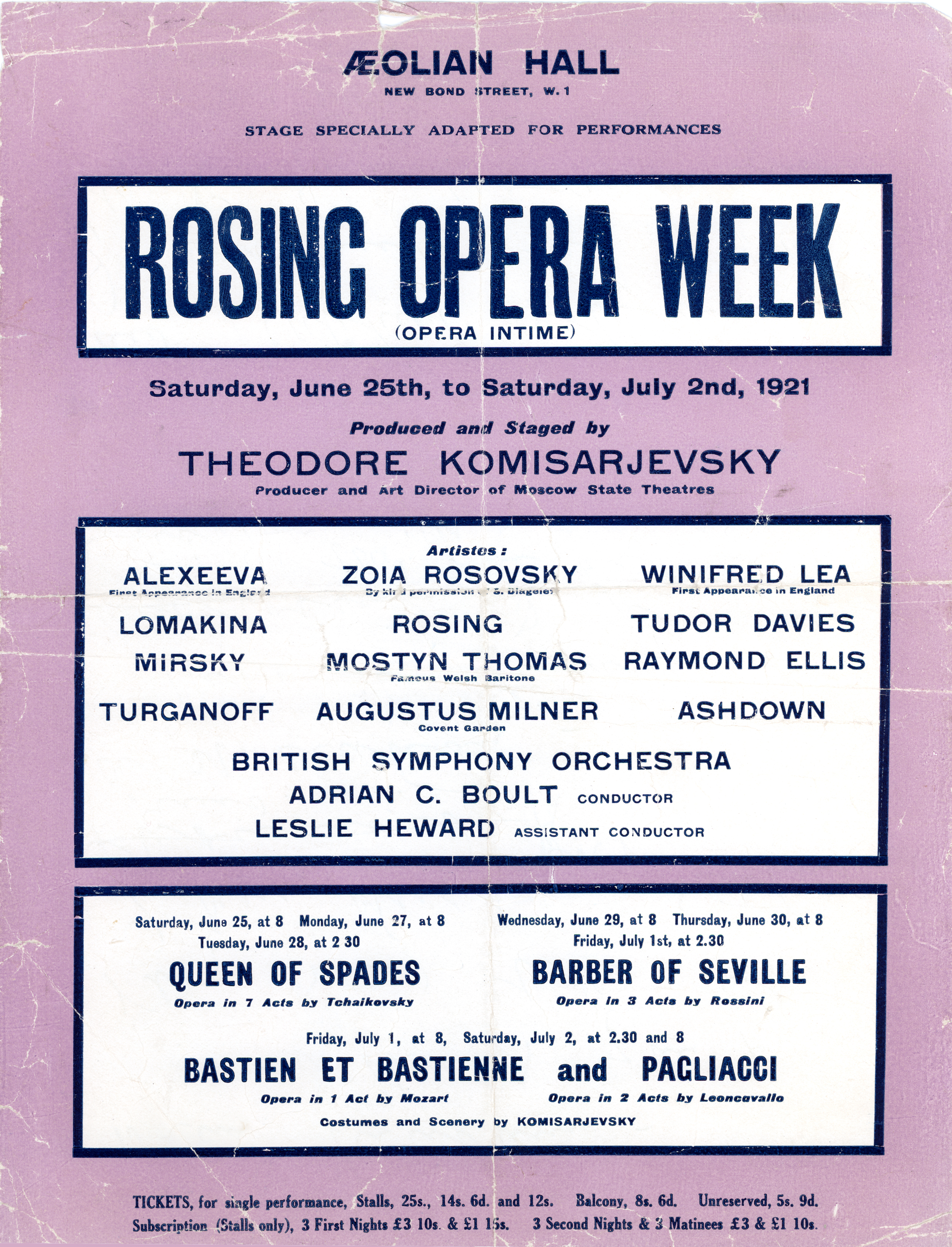
Rosing Opera Week at the Aeolian Hall, June 1921, with the BSO

At the second "Orchestral Plebiscite Concert" on 16 June, Hamilton Harty conducted Elgar's Enigma Variations and Bantock's The Sea Reivers: and Walter Damrosch took the podium for performances of the 'Dirge' from Edward MacDowell's Indian Pieces, Adventures in a Perambulator by John Alden Carpenter and three numbers from Damrosch's own Iphigenia in Aulis.

The Russian tenor recitalist Vladimir Rosing presented a week of small-scale opera at the Aeolian Hall from 25 June to 2 July 1921, with stage director Theodore Komisarjevsky. This brief season of Opéra Intime included The Queen of Spades, The Barber of Seville, Bastien und Bastienne, and Pagliacci. The stage of the Aeolian Hall was very small, and looked "overcrowded with more than six people on it." Apart from Rosing, other singers in the Tchaikovsky were Augustus Milner, (Note: An Irish baritone who sang in the première of Busoni's Arlecchino in Zurich in 1917, where he also gave a recital of Irish music promoted by James Joyce in 1919.) Moses Mirsky, (Note: "The Boy Cantor", made records for Zonophone in 1905 aged about 11, won a scholarship to the Guildhall School of Music in 1919 and became Professor of Singing there.) and Raymond Ellis. (Note: Photo at "Raymond Ellis as Papageno in The Magic Flute, September 1924". Europeana Collections. (Website in Maltese).) Winifred Lea, Tudor Davies and Mostyn Thomas appeared in Mozart's comedy, and Raymond Ellis sang Silvio in Pagliacci. The orchestra consisted of principals of the British Symphony Orchestra, with an organ and piano and "did its work very effectively under Mr. Adrian C. Boult." The scores were reduced for the purpose by Leslie Heward. The Opéra Intime company then toured Glasgow and Edinburgh.

==== People's Palace concerts ====
The People's Palace (now part of Queen Mary College) on Mile End Road, London, was opened by Queen Victoria on 14 May 1887. It included the Queen's Hall for concerts, a vaulted reading room and a Polytechnic college. It was destroyed by fire in 1931.

The British Symphony Orchestra under Boult gave two seasons of orchestral concerts in 1921 and 1922. Use of the hall was given rent-free by William Ellison-Macartney, Governor of the People's Palace. Boult remembers meeting him at the pavilion at Lord's Cricket Ground, where he was also a governor. The swimming-pool at the People's Palace was much appreciated by Boult and members of the orchestra after concerts.

The first concert took place on 16 October 1921. Boult conducted Brandenburg Concerto No. 3 in G for strings (Bach), A Shropshire Lad by George Butterworth, Brahms's Symphony No. 2, and Francesca da Rimini by Tchaikovsky. Boult preceded each piece with a short, non-technical spoken introduction from the podium. Although these were well-received, Boult realised that "many of the audience were from the West End, so knew as much as I did about the music. This cured me of the desire to talk to my audiences."

A second People's Palace concert followed on 30 October. Mendelssohn's Hebrides Overture; Beethoven's 5th Symphony, Domenico Scarlatti arr. Tommasini – The Good-Humoured Ladies, (Note: Boult had made his very first gramophone recording with the Tommasini suite and the BSO on 5 & 16 November 1920 & on 21 July 1921. See also British Symphony Orchestra discography.) and Armstrong Gibbs's incidental music for Maurice Maeterlinck's The Betrothal. It was reviewed by The Times the following day:

"A storm of applause ... Mr Holding leads a body of efficient and ardent musicians. They must have felt they were playing to enthusiasts, and there is no performer in that case who does not surpass himself. An audience seldom knows how much all that is worth having in music lies in its own hands."

On 13 November the overture was Beethoven's Egmont Overture, Frederick Holding gave Elgar's Violin Concerto, and the symphony was Mozart's No. 39 in E♭.

Other works included in the programmes of the six concerts before Christmas: Schubert: C major symphony, and one by Haydn; Elgar: 2nd symphony ("with which Mr. Boult made such a stir at Queen's Hall last year"), and the Violin Concerto; Holst: Beni Mora Suite; Richard Strauss: Don Quixote; Bliss's Mêlée Fantastique; Frederick Laurence: Dance of the Witch Girl; overtures to Weber's Der Freischütz and ]Wagner's Die Meistersinger von Nürnberg overtures, and others.

Eugene Cruft, the principal double-bass, was the orchestra's secretary in 1921.

=== 1922 ===
Vaughan Williams in 1922

The first People's Palace concert of the new year took place on 15 January 1922. Works played included Mozart's Don Giovanni overture; Beethoven's 4th Symphony; George Butterworth's first published work, Two English Idylls (1910–11); and Wagner's Siegfried Idyll.

On January 22 the Bach Choir, under its chief conductor Ralph Vaughan Williams, joined the British Symphony Orchestra and gave three of Bach's Church cantatas: Bide with Us, Jesus took unto Him the Twelve, and The Sages of Sheba. César Franck's Symphony in D minor and John Ireland's The Forgotten Rite were played by the orchestra under Boult on February 12. The concerts were now taking place weekly.

The BSO conducted by Boult gave an orchestral concert on 2 February 1922 as part of the Oxford Subscription Concerts, including Butterworth's A Shropshire Lad and Elgar's Symphony No. 2.

Nevertheless, attendance figures at the People's Palace concerts had fallen sharply, and after a concert on 5 March 1922 which included Vaughan Williams's London Symphony, they were disbanded.

At the Queen's Hall on 7 April 1922, Vaughan Williams again conducted the Bach Choir with The Northern Singers (Chrissie MacDiarmid, Florence Taylor, John Adams and George Parker) with the British Symphony Orchestra, led by Frederick Holding. Included in the programme were: William Byrd: Christ is Risen Again; Charles Burke: St Patrick's Prayer, Fantasia for chorus and orchestra on two Irish Hymn Melodies; (Note: Broadwood, Lucy E. (January 1920). "Táim Sínte ar Do Thuama. [I Lie on Your Grave]" (PDF). Journal of the Folk-Song Society. VI, part 3 (23): 175 [pdf 111]. "Mr. Burke was one of Mr. Gustav HoIst's musical students at the Morley College for Working Men. He joined Mr. HoIst's composition class when already an old and grey-haired man with a very rudimentary knowledge of the theory of music. For three years Mr. Burke worked hard at counterpoint during his scanty leisure; selecting Irish traditional airs to arrange and using them with wonderful sincerity and musical perception. In 1912 he finished the Fantasia [...] This extraordinarily lovely work was performed at a Morley College concert in 1912, when its power, beauty and originality startled and profoundly moved an audience which included critical musicians of experience. Meanwhile the composer continued to work eagerly at orchestration under Mr. HoIst's training. He was writing a set of orchestral variations on an Irish tune when death called him away in February 1917. With him died a musician of rare genius who undoubtedly would have taken his place amongst the very best had the circumstances of his modest life permitted. In the words of Mr. HoIst "If old Charles Burke had been a R.C.M. or R.A.M. student, or an Oxford man, how different things would be!) Holst's Choral Hymns from the Rig Veda; and the Stabat Mater by Dvořák.

=== 1923 ===
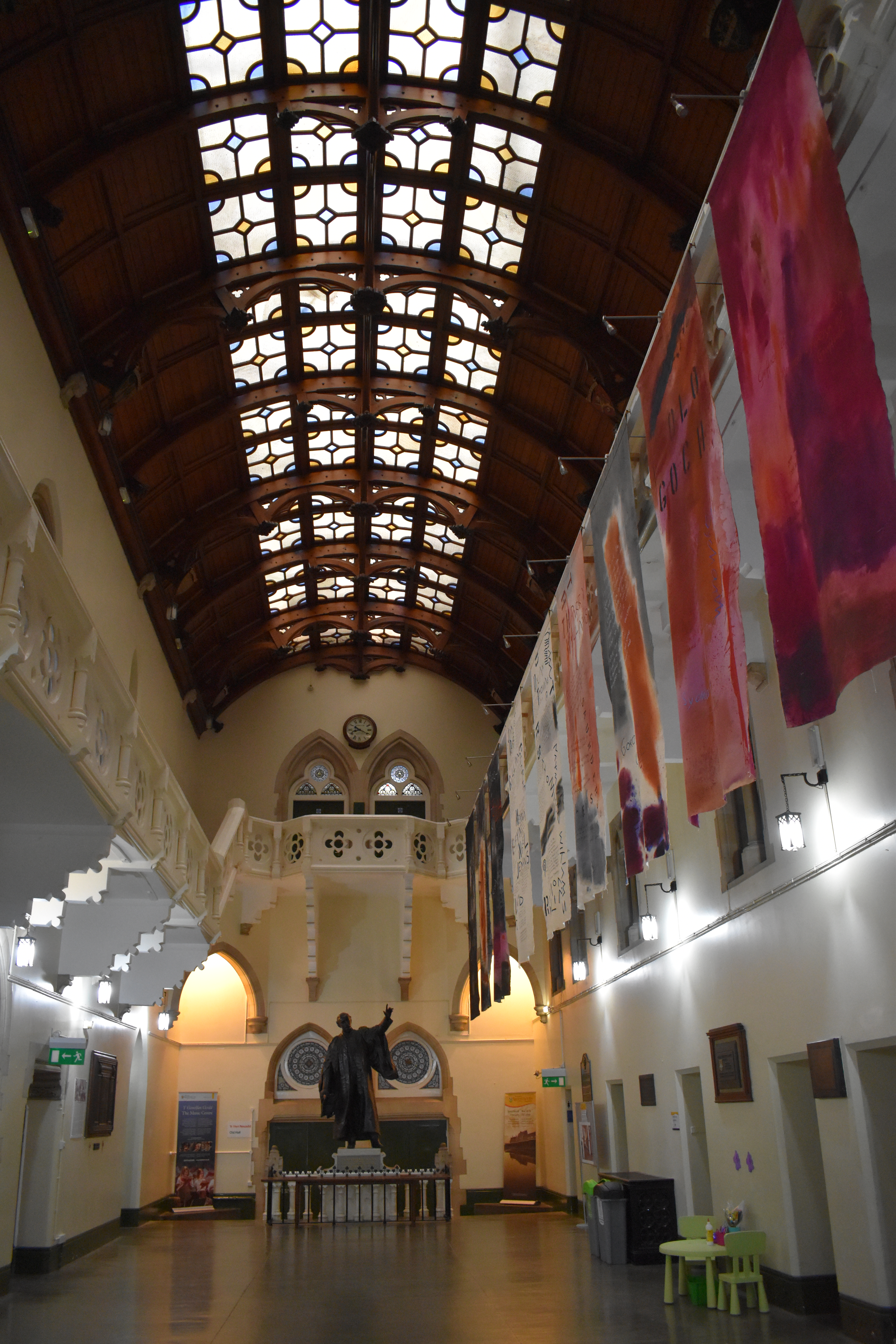
Aberystwyth Old College Hall

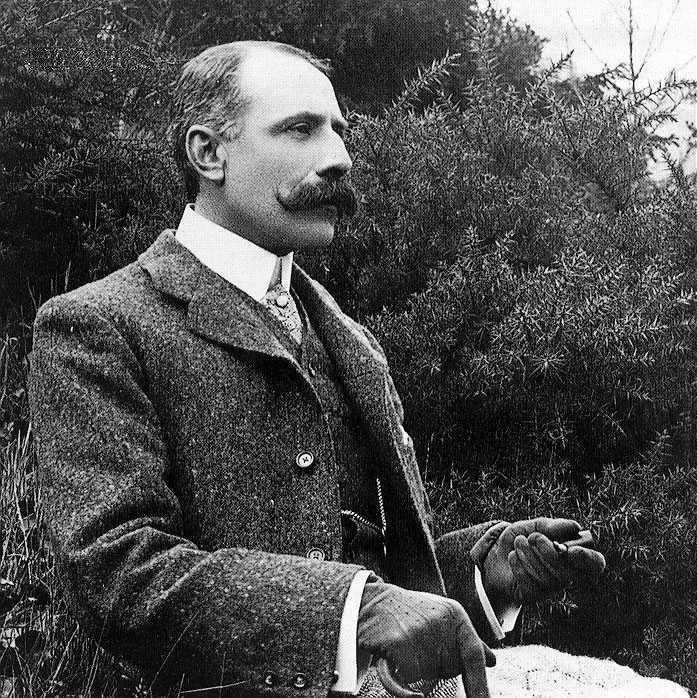
Elgar in the early 1900s

Boult seems to have made his last records with the orchestra in February 1923. (See also British Symphony Orchestra discography). The BSO's last concert appearance seems to have been with Elgar in Aberystwyth in 1923.

A poster for the 4th Aberystwyth Festival advertised the special visit of Sir Edward Elgar and the British Symphony Orchestra, London, 22, 23 and 25 June 1923.

An advance notice in The Musical Times gives the details:

"The fourth Aberystwyth Festival will be held by the University College of Wales at the University Hall, Aberystwyth, on June 22 to 25. The conductors will be Sir Edward Elgar, Sir Walford Davies [Professor of Music at Aberystwyth], and Dr. Adrian C. Boult. The choir and orchestra will be formed of members of the College Choral and Orchestral Unions, with various other contingents, and the British Symphony Orchestra. The following is the programme: June 22, Mozart's Symphony in E flat and works by Elgar; June 23, Beethoven's seventh Symphony and Choral Fantasia; June 24, public rehearsal of the St. Matthew Passion; June 25, the St. Matthew Passion (afternoon) and miscellaneous programme (evening)."

Elgar and Jerusalem

According to Sir Jack Westrup in a letter to The Musical Times (October 1969), Elgar's orchestration of Parry's Jerusalem was originally made for the Leeds Festival in 1922 when the first half of one of the concerts was devoted entirely to Parry's music, conducted by Sir Hugh Allen. Allen used it again in Oxford in a performance by the Oxford Bach Choir. Westrup had not heard of any performance since then. When Allen died in 1946, Westrup found the autograph of Elgar's arrangement. On the cover is written, in his own hand: 'To Hugh P. Allen in dear memory of Hubert Parry, September 1922'. When Parry's copyright expired at the end of 1968, it occurred to Westrup that Elgar's orchestration, "which is clearly designed for mass singing", should be better known, and it was published by Curwen Press.

Ian Parrott replied two months later: "Professor Sir Jack Westrup in his letter [...] says that he knows of only one performance of Elgar's orchestration of Parry's Jerusalem after the Leeds Festival of 1922. My colleague, Charles Clements, reminded me that it was used on the occasion of Elgar's visit to the Aberystwyth Festival of 1923. On that occasion Walford Davies and Mr Clements played as a piano duet in the front of the orchestra and he felt that Elgar did not wholly approve, especially as Sir Walford insisted on having the lid open. However, since it is for 'mass singing', no doubt Elgar fell in with Sir Walford's typical ad hoc treatment."

=== Orchestra members ===
- Albert Sammons – leader in 1909
- Frederick Holding – leader in 1921
- Eugene Cruft – principal double bass from 1919.
- James MacDonagh – principal oboe / cor anglais

Frederick Holding

A pupil of Carl Flesch, Holding owned a Stradivarius ('The Penny').

He was leader of the 'old' Philharmonic Quartet, formed in 1915 initially consisting of Arthur Beckwith (first violinist), (Sir) Eugene Aynsley Goossens (second violin), Raymond Jeremy (viola) and Cedric Sharpe (cellist). World War 1 interrupted their work as some of the members were eventually called up for service. In 1918 they reformed with Frederick Holding taking over from Goossens, becoming the first violin in 1919 with Thomas Peatfield the new second violinist. For a series of concerts in February 1921 at the Essex Hall the quartet consisted on 2 February of: Holding (1st violin), Samuel Kutcher (2nd violin), E. Tomlinson (viola) and Giovanni Barbirolli (cello). For the second concert on 13 February 1921 it consisted of Frederick Holding, Samuel Kutcher, Raymond Jeremy and Cedric Sharpe.

Eugene Cruft

During WW1, Eugene Cruft helped recruit musicians to entertain the troops, while serving with the Motor Transport division of the Army Service Corps. He fought with the 2nd Battalion of the Rifle Brigade at Passchendale and on the Somme. He helped to form the new British Symphony Orchestra. He was the orchestra's Honorary Secretary from its inception, and became a life-long friend of Boult. He was principal double-bass player in the BBC Symphony Orchestra 1929–1947 during Boult's conductorship.

James MacDonagh

James MacDonagh (1881–1931), an accomplished musician on several instruments, was principal oboist and cor anglais player with the British Symphony Orchestra. He was the third eldest brother of Thomas MacDonagh, who was shot in Kilmainham Gaol with Padraic Pearse and Tom Clarke after the 1916 Easter Rising. His son, Terence MacDonagh (1907/08–86), also played the oboe and cor anglais with both the BBC Symphony Orchestra (of which he was a founder member), and with the Royal Philharmonic Orchestra under Sir Thomas Beecham; he served on the board of the Royal College of Music.

== Third formation: recording orchestra, 1930–1932 ==
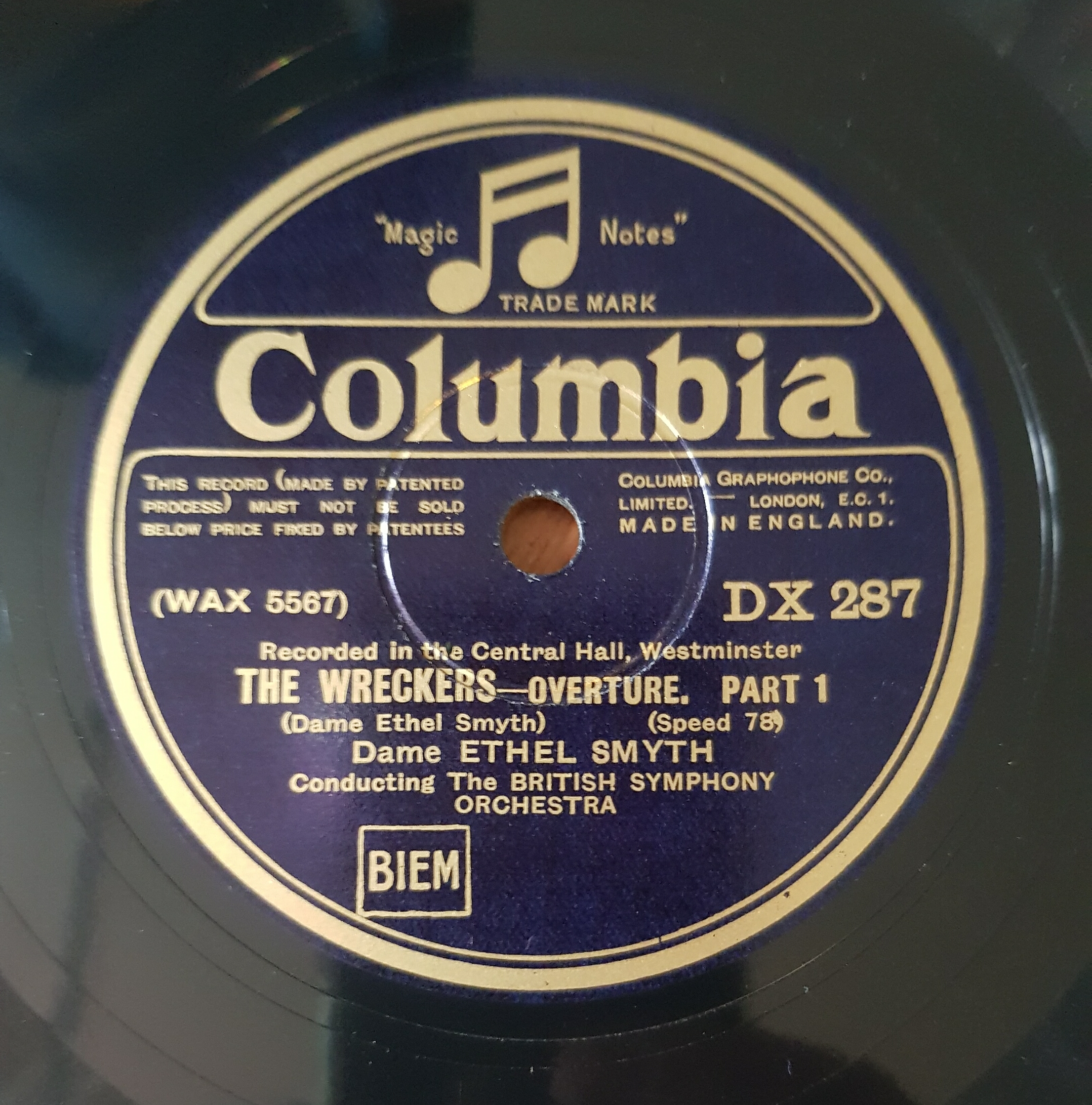
Ethel Smyth's recording of her The Wreckers overture with the British Symphony Orchestra

After the 4th Aberystwyth Festival in summer 1923, the orchestra's name seems to disappear entirely until the 1930s when it appears on around fifteen or so 78 rpm recordings made by the Columbia Graphophone Company in Central Hall, Westminster from 1930 to 1932. (Note: A search of JSTOR for concert notices returns no results at all from the end of 1923 until a handful of record reviews from 1931 to 1933.) According to Michael Gray, at least three of these electrical recordings were very probably made by the Orchestra of the Royal Philharmonic Society, and it seems possible that this pickup orchestra is responsible for the remainder, as well as recordings of Sibelius's first two symphonies with Robert Kajanus.

A certain amount of mystique surrounds these vintage recordings made around 90 years ago: partly because the identity of this ensemble is somewhat uncertain; partly because in only a handful of recordings do the details taken from Columbia's own contemporary session logs and matrix notes actually match up completely with the information on the record labels; and partly because of Columbia's habit of replacing old recordings with newer ones (often of different works and by other artists), but keeping the old catalogue number.

Conductors of these recording sessions include Ethel Smyth, Oskar Fried, Bruno Walter, Felix Weingartner, and Henry Wood.

== Fourth formation: public concerts, 1934–1939 ==
In October 1934 a somewhat subdued notice appeared in the organ advertisement section of The Musical Times:

The London Society of Organists, South-Western Branch [ie London SW]. "The British Symphony Orchestra (recruited from unemployed British Musicians) will supply small combinations for Oratorios, Cantatas, and any Church functions needing musicians."

From January 1934 to January 1935 a British Symphony Orchestra appeared in three National Sunday League Concerts at the London Palladium, all conducted by Charles Hambourg. (Note: The late Basil Tschaikov had a thing or two to say about Mr. Hambourg's time-beating: Tschaikov, Basil (2006). "Part 4: The joys of touring". The Music Goes Round and Around.) 7 January 1934: orchestral concert. 4 November 1934: the violin soloist was Marie Hall, who had given the first performance of The Lark Ascending with an earlier British Symphony Orchestra in June 1921. On 13 January 1935 the concert included the duo-piano team of Vronsky & Babin.

The English composer and conductor Charles Proctor gave two concerts on 12 November 1938 and 29 April 1939, conducting his own Alexandra Choral Society with a British Symphony Orchestra at the Northern Polytechnic Institute, Holloway Road.

== Recent formations ==
=== 1989 ===
The music for the 1989 film La Révolution française, directed by Robert Enrico and Richard T. Heffron, was composed and conducted by Georges Delerue. It was performed by the British Symphony Orchestra with chorus. This seems to have been an ensemble of freelance musicians from the Greater London area, recorded at His Master's Voice's Abbey Road Studios in August 1989.

=== 2004 ===
The British Symphony Orchestra was specially flown to Lucknow, to perform modern and traditional Indian melodies at the wedding of Sushanto and Seemanto Roy, the sons of the Indian businessman Subrata Roy, chairman of Sahara India Pariwar.

=== 2016 ===
Philip Mackenzie, as principal conductor, formed a British Symphony Orchestra in 2016. The orchestra is made up of freelance musicians and based in London. It has performed with, among other things, the Revival ABBA Tribute Band, Never the Bride and Gordon Hendricks.

George Morton was the guest conductor of the British Symphony Orchestra's tour in China (27 December 2017 – 9 January 2018). They played nine concerts including works by contemporary Chinese composers, along with Western music including Sibelius: Finlandia; Tchaikovsky: Marche Slave; Bizet: Carmen Suite No. 1; and Elgar: Enigma Variations.

== In popular culture ==
- In Diana Wynne Jones's 1984 novel for young adults Fire and Hemlock, Thomas Lynn (Tam Lin) was a member of a 'British Symphony Orchestra' and there is reference to a poster or photo of other musicians in the band, with some of whom Tom wants to form a quartet. (Note: Wynne Jones' partner was the respected Chaucerian scholar John Burrow. who she met just before going up to Oxford in c1952.)
- A 'British Symphony Orchestra' appears in The Lady in the Van, a 2015 film directed by Nicholas Hytner, written by Alan Bennett, and starring Maggie Smith as 'Miss Shepherd' and Alex Jennings as Alan Bennet. It tells the (mostly) true story of 'Mary Shepherd', an elderly woman who lived in various dilapidated vans on Bennett's driveway in London for 15 years. Miss Shepherd was a musician. In one scene when the character of Alan Bennett is sifting through Mary Shepherd's paperwork, he finds a poster for a concert at the King's Hall in which she played Chopin's Piano concerto No. 1 with the British Symphony Orchestra. (Note: At one point in the screenplay, there is a hint that Miss Shepherd played in a Prom concert. This is reinforced by the shot of the poster, apparently for a concert at the King's Hall. In reality, the Henry Wood Promenade Concerts before the war took place in the Queen's Hall (destroyed in the war), and not in the 'King's Hall'. According to Bennett, "I have allowed myself a little leeway in speculating about Miss Shepeherd's concert career, except that if, as her brother said, she studied with Alfred Cortot she must have been a pianist of some ability." There seems to be little, if any, reference to any such actual event before WW2, and the entire episode would thus appear to be the well-researched figment of Mr. Bennett's fevered (if fecund) imagination.) The BSO is played in the film by the BBC Concert Orchestra, conducted by George Fenton, who also composed the incidental music.

== Disambiguation ==
For other orchestras with the same initials, see BSO § Music.

- Not to be confused with the British Women's Symphony Orchestra or the British Youth Symphony Orchestra. (Note: Sometimes called the 'British Youth Orchestra'. Conducted by Trevor Harvey 1960–72, and defunct after c1982. In turn, not to be confused with the National Youth Orchestra of Great Britain, founded 1948, or with various National Schools Symphony Orchestras.)
- A general quiz website includes a reference to a certain "Karl Mack (german conductor of the British Symphony Orchestra), arrested for not playing the star spangled banner."[sic] (Note: "Election of 1912". quizlet.com. This is apparently a mangling of Karl Muck's National Anthem controversy while he was conductor of the Boston Symphony Orchestra – possibly a mild original OCR-ism where Muck=Mack and Boston=British.) A web page including a biography of the composer Carlos Guastavino mentions 'the British Symphony Orchestra', probably meaning the BBC Symphony Orchestra.
- Various films and 78 rpm recordings featured ensembles with a similar-sounding title, with misleading results for those unable to read. For example, the band for Alfred Hitchcock's 1929 Blackmail—produced by British International Pictures—was the 'British International Symphony Orchestra' and not, according to at least one source, the 'British Symphony Orchestra'.
- A number of catchy 78 rpm recordings feature the studio ensemble of the Gaumont-British film production company, conducted by Louis Levy, general music director at Gaumont. Although the name is correctly hyphenated on e.g. record labels and in listings in the Radio Times (often on a line break), the dash has been frequently omitted in later transcriptions, perhaps leading to confusion. The names used by this ensemble include, chronologically, 'Gaumont-British Studio Orchestra', (Note: Raymond J. Walker briefly refers to a 'Gaumont British Symphony Orchestra' in his a review of a compilation album including Levy and the 'Gaumont-British Studio Orchestra' playing selections from the 1933 Cicely Courtneidge film Aunt Sally. The original film featured Debroy Somers and his Band in the cabaret spots, with probably Levy's studio ensemble providing the general music. Levy recorded selections from the film a year later with the 'Gaumont-British Studio Orchestra', which later became his 'Gaumont-British Symphony', with or without hyphen. Both the album label and the notes by David Ades omit the hyphen when referring to the 'Gaumont-British Studio Orchestra', and its later incarnation, the 'Gaumont-British Symphony'. Walker expands this to an unhyphenated "Gaumont British Symphony Orchestra" (which did actually exist in 1937): but he also throws some interesting light on the nomenclature of 'The British Symphony Orchestra' and its somewhat impermanent nature. (Note: Walker, Raymond J (n.d.). "Review of 'The Golden Age of Light Music – British Cinema and Theatre Orchestras' – Volume 2". MusicWeb International. "As David Ades' interesting notes make mention, the final track of selections from the Courtneidge film "Aunt Sally" is the first recording by Louis Levy with the Gaumont British Symphony Orchestra; pretentiously titled, I suggest, when its film studio players would be freelancers. It also documents an uplifting composition by the forgotten American, Harry M. Woods [...] An interesting full page picture in the booklet shows a recording session of the Gaumont British orchestra with Louis Levy standing above them on a temporary wooden stage.")) 'Gaumont-British Symphony' (Note: e.g. Mysteriously transcribed without hyphen: "Louis Levy and his Gaumont British Symphony – Swing High, Swing Low (1937)". Youtube.) 'Gaumont British Symphony', and the 'Gaumont-British Symphony Orchestra'. (Note: The 'Gaumont-British Symphony Orchestra', with Levy conducting, featured in two BBC films made at Pinewood Studios for its Round the Film Studios TV series, aired on 30 September and 4 October 1937.)
