= Marie Hall =

British musician (1884–1956)

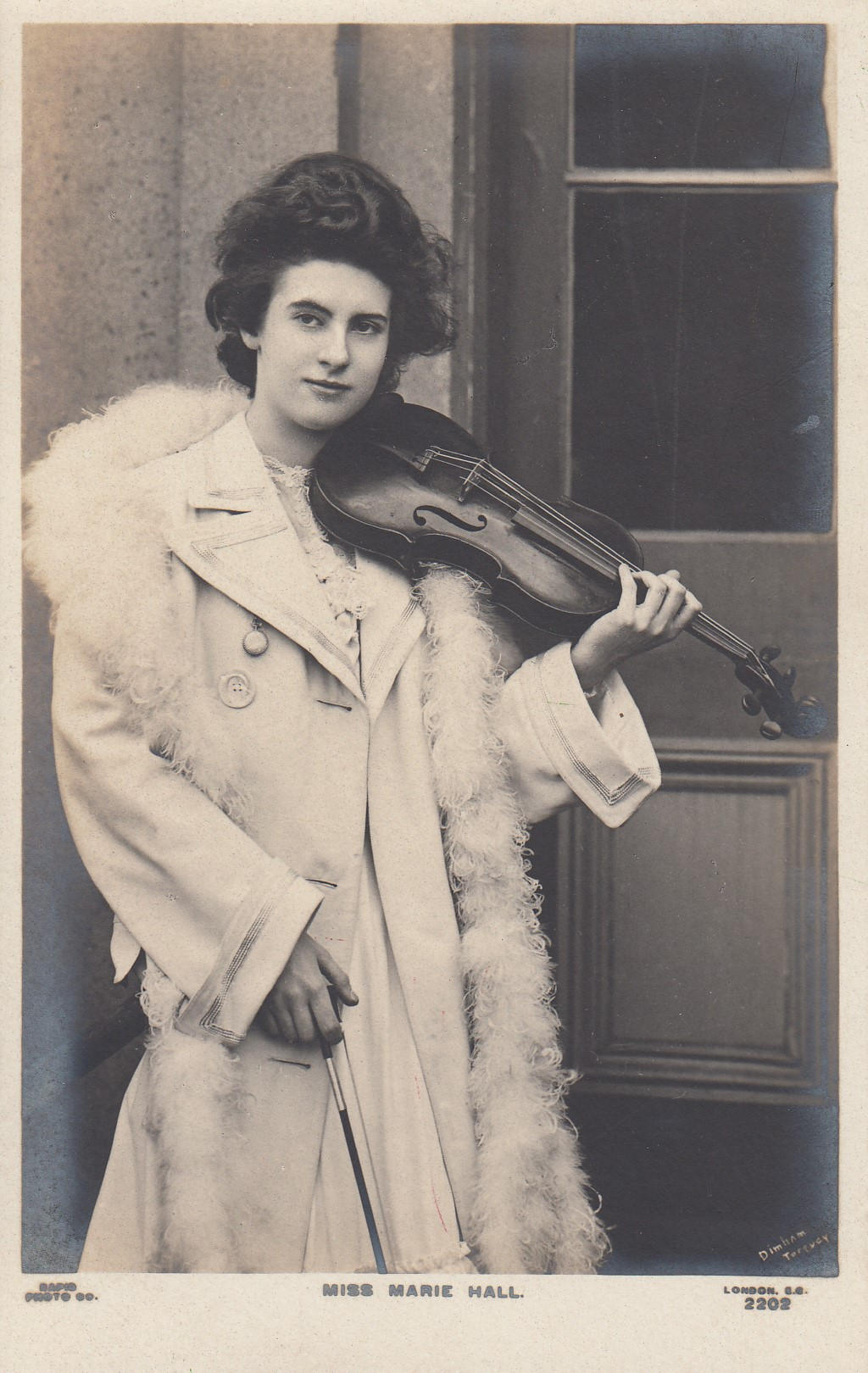

Background information
- Born: 8 April 1884
- Origin: England
- Died: 11 November 1956 (aged 72)
- Instrument: Violin

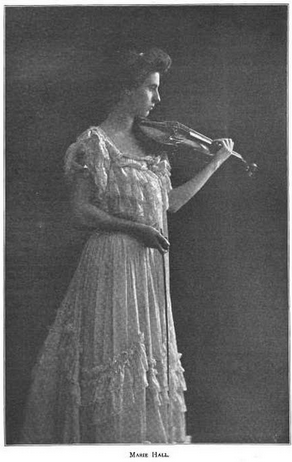
Marie Hall, from a 1907 publication.

Marie Pauline Hall (8 April 1884 – 11 November 1956) was an English violinist.

== Biography ==
Hall was born in Newcastle upon Tyne, England. She received her first lessons from her father Edmund Felix Hall, who was a harpist in the orchestra of the Carl Rosa Opera Company. Her uncle Frederick Hall was also a harpist, with the Queen's Hall Orchestra. She also studied with a local teacher, Hildegarde Werner. Hall's family moved around the country with her father and spent some years in Guarlford, a small village near Malvern. When she was nine, Émile Sauret heard her play, and she gained one of the recently instituted Wessely Exhibitions at the Royal Academy of Music, London: but owing to her father's lack of means she did not take it up.

She continued to study under several well known teachers, including a year with Edward Elgar in 1894 aged 10, August Wilhelmj in London in 1896, and Max Mossel in Birmingham in 1898. The story goes that a clergyman found her in a half-starved condition playing for coppers in the streets of Bristol, took her to London and with the assistance of some friends—including W. Ebsworth Hill of the renowned violin makers W.E. Hill & Sons, composer Jane Roeckel and philanthropist Philip Napier Miles—placed her in a position to receive lessons from Professor Johann Kruse (who had studied with Joachim) in 1900. In 1901, upon the advice of Jan Kubelík, she went to study under his former tutor Otakar Ševčík in Prague.

Hall played for the first time in Prague in November 1902, Vienna in January 1903, and made her London début on 16 February 1903 aged nineteen with Henry Wood at St James's Hall. The demanding programme included Paganini's first concerto, the Tchaikovsky concerto and Henryk Wieniawski's Fantaisie Brillante on themes from Faust. She scored a success in all these places. She made an international concert tour in 1904, playing in Germany, Canada, America and Australia, including an impromptu concert in a large marquee in Fiji with a particularly badly-tuned piano.

She made a tour through South Africa in 1910, for which she received £10,000 ($50,000) said at the time to be the largest ever paid to a violinist.

She possessed a technique that she believed was due to Ševčík's teaching. While she appeared to be not very strong physically, Hall proved herself strong enough to go on long tours and perform exacting programs without fatigue.

Ralph Vaughan Williams completed The Lark Ascending with Hall's assistance, and dedicated it to her. She gave the first public performances, that for violin and piano at a concert of the Avonmouth and Shirehampton Choral Society on 15 December 1920, and that for violin and orchestra at the Queen's Hall with the British Symphony Orchestra under Adrian Boult on 14 June 1921. She owned and played one of the two Viotti Stradivarius violins.

Hall's recording career began in 1903 with Gramophone & Typewriter Ltd and continued until her final, acoustic discs made for HMV in 1924. In 1916, she recorded an abridged version of the Elgar Violin Concerto with the composer conducting.

Hall has been described as "perhaps the most successful woman violinist of any during the pre-war period, a truly international celebrity,” and as "a very charming woman, very small and jolly and with a great sense of humour. She was also extremely generous." She died in Cheltenham on 11 November 1956.

The 1709 Stradivarius violin which she played for more than 50 years, now known as the "Marie Hall Stradivarius,” was sold at Sotheby's in April 1988 for a record £473,000 to an anonymous South American bidder.

== Personal life ==
In 1911, Hall married her business manager Edward Baring; they settled in Cheltenham and had one child, Pauline. For the last years of her life she lived in Cheltenham in a large Victorian villa, "Inveresk", in Eldorado Road.
