= Raymond Rôze =

English conductor and composer

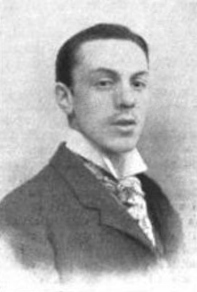
In The Sketch, 9 February 1898

Raymond Rôze (14 July 1873 – 30 March 1920) was an English composer and conductor.

== Biography ==
He was born in London and the son of the French soprano Marie Rôze, and the natural son of Prince Alfred, Duke of Edinburgh (and therefore the grandson of Queen Victoria). He studied in Brussels with Arthur De Greef before first working in England at the Lyceum Theatre where he was musical director. He also established a singing school in London in 1899 and was musical director for various theatre companies. His output consisted mainly of incidental music for plays including a number at His Majesty's Theatre under Sir Herbert Tree, including Trilby in 1895. His music was twice performed in London's Promenade concerts (in 1901 and 1911).

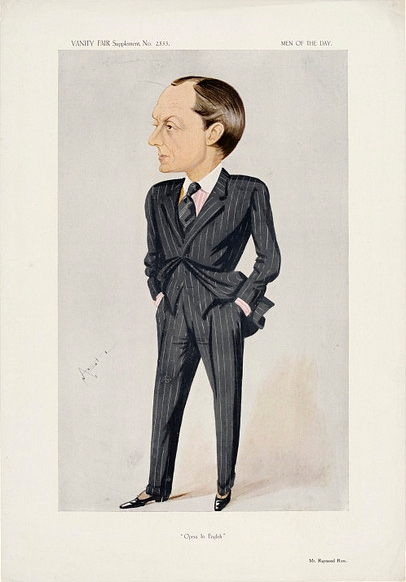
Caricatured in Vanity Fair in 1913

Rôze was musical director of the Royal Opera House, and his three-act opera Joan of Arc was premiered there on 1 November 1913. A review in The Times was very critical of the opera's disjointed nature and warned that "a drama with the characters singing and an orchestra to accompany them is not necessarily an opera." Later in the same month he engaged Frank Bridge to conduct Richard Wagner’s opera Tannhäuser. Joan of Arc received a further performance in Paris at a fundraising event for the Red Cross in 1917 but was ultimately unsuccessful. The opera was written in English at a time when there were few English operas in the repertoire. With his opera, Rôze sought, in his own words, to establish the "English language in the position it should hold on the operatic stage once and for all." In the same 1913 season he conducted Georges Bizet's opera Carmen in English. A gala performance of Joan of Arc in the presence of King George and Queen Mary in December 1913 was interrupted by suffragist protestors.

Rôze was the founding conductor of the British Symphony Orchestra, a professional ensemble formed in 1919 from demobilised soldiers returning to London after World War I.

He was married to an American soprano, Louise Miles (nom de scène Marie Sora), from New York. His daughter Marie-Louise Roze was also a soprano. Her second husband was the Belgian sculptor John Cluysenaar.

== Selected works ==
- Overture and incidental music to Julius Caesar, op. 16 (1899)
- Incidental music to Sweet Nell of Old Drury (1900)
- Extase d'Amour op. 28 (1904, Schott, London)
- The Love Birds, musical comedy (1904)
- Incidental Music to The Scarlet Pimpernel, (1913)
- Joan of Arc (opera in a prologue, three acts and seven tableaux) (1911) (score is now in the British Library)
- Antony and Cleopatra (Performed at the London Proms in 1911)
- Poem of Victory for Violin and Orchestra (1919)
