= Thomas Quinlan (impresario) =

Thomas Quinlan in a monochrome photograph

Thomas Quinlan (10 March 1881, Bury – 20 November 1951, Holborn) was a musical impresario, best known for founding the Quinlan Opera Company.

== Early life and career ==
Thomas Quinlan was the son of Dennis Quinlan, a railway clerk, and Ellen Quinlan, née Carroll. He was the eldest of five children.

Quinlan studied as an accountant, and in 1901 he was company secretary of the Withnell Brick company. He also trained as a baritone; he was first coached by Granville Bantock, and later studied for the operatic stage under Victor Maurel. He began music management in 1906, touring among others Enrico Caruso, Fritz Kreisler, John Philip Sousa and including a Nellie Melba tour of Ireland in 1908.

On 4 July 1907 he married Dora Collins (daughter of James Collins, a tea merchant) at St Peter and St Edward Church, 43 Palace Street, Pimlico, London SW1. The witnesses were Gertrude Browning and the pianist Angelo Fronani, who married the opera singer Zélie de Lussan in 1907.

== 1910 ==
In 1910 London heard – or had the opportunity of hearing – more opera than ever before in its history. Between mid-February and New Year's Eve, Sir Thomas Beecham either conducted or was responsible as impresario for 190 performances at Covent Garden Opera House and His Majesty's Theatre.

Beecham extended his dream into the provinces with The Beecham Opera Comique Company. As his manager, he chose Quinlan. The company would present two "tuneful lightweights" as he called them, The Tales of Hoffmann and Die Fledermaus. The latter was known at first as "The Bat", but soon it became "A Viennese Masquerade" and then it was dropped, Hoffmann being given exclusively. Some cities experienced one or both operas for the first time. Six evening and one or two matinee performances were given weekly in thirteen cities during the autumn segment (Blackpool, Belfast, Dublin, London, Manchester, Glasgow, Edinburgh, Liverpool, Newcastle upon Tyne, Leeds, Nottingham, Birmingham and Brighton) with fourteen more after Christmas (Swansea, Fulham, Bournemouth, Dublin, Southampton, Leicester, Wolverhampton, Hull, Manchester, Sheffield, Bristol, Cardiff, Plymouth, and Portsmouth).

== 1911 ==
Quinlan then decided to set up his own company, feeling that the provinces and "the dominions beyond the seas", as he told J.D. Fitzgerald in an interview in The Lone Hand in Sydney, had never had the chance of hearing grand opera on the same scale as Covent Garden. In 1911 the Quinlan Opera Company was formed in Liverpool. Quinlan personally supervised everything, casting the operas himself, and seeing every act of every opera before it was presented to the public.

The company rehearsed in London for five months before touring the provinces, (opening in Liverpool, where the results exceeded Quinlan's expectations), making a visit to Ireland with performances at the Theatre Royal Dublin from 26 December 1911 to 9 January 1912, and then setting off for Australia for the 1912 season. In February 1912 the company performed in South Africa (Cape Town and Johannesburg) on their way to Australia.

== 1912 ==
The first week of the 1912 season presented in conjunction with the Australian impresario J. C. Williamson, at Her Majesty's Theatre, Melbourne, put up a record still unbroken and likely to remain so: four Australian premieres in eight days. The company opened on Saturday, 8 June (having only arrived in the country the previous Wednesday), with a gala premiere of The Tales of Hoffmann, followed on the Monday by the first performance in Australia of the Paris version of Tannhäuser, the Australian premiere of La fanciulla del West on the Tuesday, another performance of Hoffmann on the Wednesday, Rigoletto on the Thursday, the Australian premiere of Tristan und Isolde on the Friday, and the Australian premiere of The Prodigal Son by Debussy as part of a double bill with Hänsel und Gretel on the Saturday afternoon, with Hoffmann again that night. This quick start and rate of bringing forward new productions was only possible because this was a complete company, with its own chorus and orchestra – the only one to visit Australia – and had already performed all its repertoire in England and South Africa on its way to Australia.

The Australian tour was limited to just ten weeks (five in Melbourne and five in Sydney). The presentation of fifteen operas, four of them new, in just under five weeks, in itself provided plenty of variety. The remaining operas were Die Walküre, Aida, La Bohème, Carmen, Lohengrin, Madama Butterfly, Faust and La traviata.

The artists were mostly British, with two returning Australian singers, Lalla Miranda and Julia Caroli. The company also included the British tenor John Coates and Britain's leading dramatic soprano, Agnes Nicholls. There was a total of 163 people in the party (plus a three-year-old child for Butterfly), including the permanent orchestra of 55 and a chorus of 60, and there were three conductors: Ernst Knoch for the Wagner operas, Hoffmann, Hansel and Gretel and Carmen; Tullio Voghera, who had conducted at the Met and been Caruso's accompanist, from the Royal Swedish Opera, for the Italian repertoire, and English composer/conductor Hubert Bath, who conducted the opening of Faust and took over other operas later in the run. He was also chorus-master.

Staging and presentation were of a high standard, under the direction of Louis P. Verande (assisted by George King), from Covent Garden where he had been responsible for the staging of Thomas Beecham's controversial 1910 Salome. Verande also had extensive Continental and American experience. All the costumes were designed by Dorothy Carleton Smyth from Glasgow, an authority on historical pageant and theatrical costumes, who travelled with the company. Quinlan pointed out that she concentrated on a harmoniously blended colour scheme, eschewing extraneous spangles and similar gewgaws. The sets for all the operas were designed by Oliver Percy Bernard, from the Boston Opera, and set models for the Puccini operas were first passed by the composer; while Humperdinck, Debussy, Cosima Wagner, Ricordi and other authorities lent their assistance with others. Quinlan claimed the largest scenic studio in England and said that a great deal of research had been done on the historical accuracy of stage accessories. The cost of moving the company and all the baggage – 365 tons of scenery, props and costumes – around the world was £100,000.

Except for Lalla Miranda, who had concert engagements in Brisbane, the company sailed for England on the day after the last performance, visiting Melbourne on the way for a Town Hall concert. Quinlan promised to return the following year, and to bring back not only the complete Ring Cycle, but also The Mastersingers and Louise.

== 1913–1914 ==
After their return to England in 1912, the company undertook a provincial tour (including a performance in Newcastle in March 1913), followed by visits to Ireland (with a performance at the Theatre Royal, Dublin on 14 May 1913) and South Africa (June to July 1913) on the way back to Australia, staging the first complete Ring Cycle in Australia.

Although the Ring, with Edna Thornton, was the highlight of the 1913 visit to Australia, there was another important Australian Wagner premiere, The Mastersingers of Nuremberg, as well as the premieres of Louise and Manon Lescaut. Apart from these, it was the sheer number of operas performed which was so impressive. In just under eight weeks in Melbourne, the company performed 25 operas, including two Ring cycles; while in Sydney, where the original season of seven weeks was extended to nine because a strike in New Zealand made it impossible to move on there as planned, another three operas were added. In all, nine of the major Wagner operas were staged – all except Parsifal – four of them for the first time; all the major Puccini operas written at the time: Manon Lescaut, La bohème, Tosca, Madama Butterfly, La fanciulla del West; the four most popular Verdi operas: Rigoletto, II trovatore, La traviata and Aida; other Italian works: Cavalleria rusticana, Pagliacci and The Barber of Seville; The Marriage of Figaro; and an assortment of French operas, from the new Louise and The Prodigal Son, to The Tales of Hoffmann, Samson and Delilah and the old favourites Carmen and Faust. Not surprisingly, some had only one performance in each city, though most had two or three – sometimes by popular demand. Exceeding that number were only Bohème and Butterfly (four each in Sydney), Samson and Delilah (five in Sydney) and, way out in front, Hoffmann (seven in Melbourne, eight in Sydney), its total of fifteen more than twice that of the nearest competitor (Samson and Delilah with seven).

It was not simply a visit to Australia, but part of a tour round the world, what Quinlan himself in an interview on arrival in Sydney, called an "All-Red Tour" (a phrase which meant something rather different in the days before the sun set on the British Empire). The intention was to return to England via New Zealand and Canada, "never", said Quinlan, "leaving the red portions of the geographical map except to hop over the border from Canada to visit some of our American cousins.... We sing in English to English-speaking peoples all the time."

The era came to an end in March 1914. After a week in Vancouver in January, the company went on to a three-week visit of the Quinlan English Opera Co at His Majesty's Theatre, Montreal; Wagner's complete Der Ring des Nibelungen was sung in Canada for the first time (and by 1990 still the only time), along with Tannhäuser, Lohengrin, The Flying Dutchman, and Tristan und Isolde. But attendance was poor, and the company decided to cut its losses and terminate its visit to Canada, even though performances had already been announced for Toronto.

Problems in New Zealand and Canada interfered with his plan of performing nine Ring cycles around the world in the space of six months, a feat he had been confident would "be mentioned with bated breath in European art circles", and the enterprise proved ruinous. Quinlan estimated that it "cost £150,000 a year to run grand opera round the world", and with disruptions to the schedule, the incomings were not enough to balance this figure.

Quinlan's enterprise came unstuck and he managed no more grand opera seasons. Despite the crash in Canada some artists had definitely been re-engaged and contracts signed. But the outbreak of World War I put paid finally to the possibility of Quinlan's plan to bring another company to Australia in 1915. The Quinlan Company became the Harrison Frewin Company, which was acquired by the impresario H B Phillips in 1916 for £1,750. In October 1918 the Carl Rosa Company acquired the Phillips and Harrison Frewin companies.

== 1919–1921 ==
In 1919 Quinlan was reported to be in London in concert management.

The 1919–1920 season of Quinlan Subscription Concerts included performances in the Usher Hall, Edinburgh by the Halle Orchestra conducted by Hamilton Harty, with Arthur De Greef (piano) [25 October 1919], and by the Sir Thomas Beecham Orchestra conducted by Albert Coates (musician) with various soloists [20 February 1920]. There was also a performance at the Theatre Royal, Dublin.

The 1920–1921 season of Quinlan Subscription Concerts included a series of five concerts at the Usher Hall, Edinburgh [16 October 1920 to 19 March 1921]. The second in series was performed by the Sir Thomas Beecham Orchestra conducted by Albert Coates (musician) with various soloists. There was also a series of 12 concerts at Kingsway Hall [October 1920 to January 1921] featuring various orchestras, including the Quinlan Orchestra and the British Symphony Orchestra, conducted by Adrian Boult.

== 1922–1951 ==
In 1922 Quinlan, in association with E. J. Carroll, arranged a tour of Australia by the Sistine Chapel Choir, which turned out to be a financial failure. In 1926 his wife, Dora, divorced him on the ground of desertion. He died in London in November 1951.
