= Basque Statistics Office =

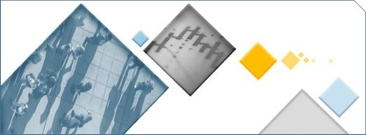
EUSTAT - Basque Statistics Office

The Basque Statistics Office (Eustat) is an autonomous agency of the Basque Government answering to the Department for the Economy and the Treasury, founded on 25 November 1986 pursuant to the Basque Government Decree 251/1986. Its mission is to collect, analyse and disseminate official statistical information on the relevant aspects of Basque society and the economy. It also carries out research and development, training and methodological support activities and works in partnership with universities, states institutions and Eurostat.

Its work is subject to the Spanish Personal Data Protection Act 15/1999, which guarantees that Eustat does not facilitate any information that can identify or individualise the suppliers of the information, who are protected by statistical confidentiality. It coordinates two advisory bodies, the Basque Statistics Commission, where the Departments of the Basque Government, the provincial councils and the local councils as producers of statistics are represented, and the Basque Statistics Council, where all social agents and representatives of society also participate.

Its statistics operations are established in the four-year plans approved by the Basque Parliament and are implemented through the Annual Statistics Programmes. The 2005-2008 Basque Statistics Plan envisaged 180 operations.

== Services ==
- Information Service
- Customized statistical information requests
- Statistical information on the website
- Databank
- Sale of publications
- Methodology Advice Service

== See also ==
- (in Spanish) Spanish Personal Data Protection Act 15/1999
