= Philip Mackenzie =

British musician

Phillip Mackenzie is a British musician and a graduate of Oxford University. He is the founder of the Amadeus Orchestra, a British orchestra dedicated to young musicians, and is the musical director of the London Mozart Symphony Orchestra.
