= Bank of Syria and Overseas =

Private bank in Syria

- Company type: Public
- ISIN: SY0021100043
- Industry: Banking
- Founded: 2004
- Headquarters: Damascus, Syria
- Area served: Syria, Saudi Arabia, Lebanon, Jordan, Egypt, United Arab Emirates, Cyprus, France, United Kingdom, Switzerland, Romania, Qatar
- Key people: Rateb Shallah (Chairman)
- Operating income: 559,759,248,070 Syrian pound (2023)
- Net income: 493,365,980,679 Syrian pound (2023)
- Total assets: 2,284,395,523,095 Syrian pound (2023)
- Website: http://www.bso.com.sy/

Bank of Syria and Overseas (Arabic: بنك سورية والمهجر) is one of the first private banks established in Syria. It started operations in January 2004. BSO belongs to BLOM Bank Group.
