= George Bentham (singer) =

English tenor

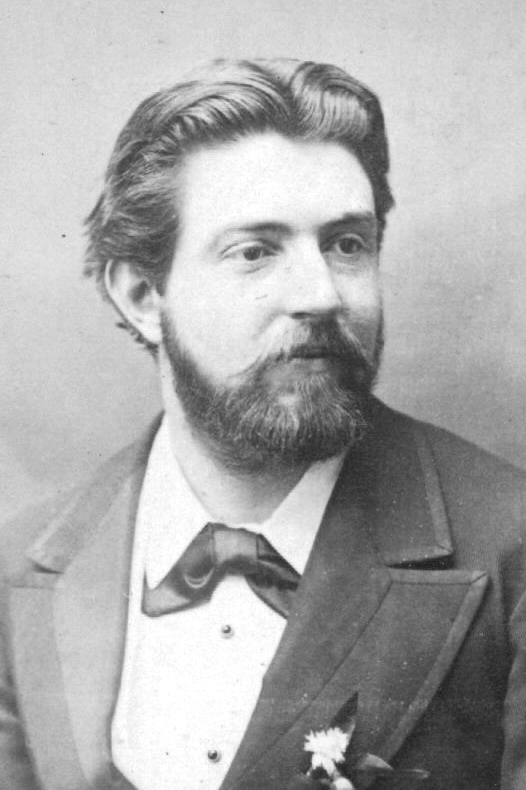
George Bentham

George Bentham (9 December 1843 – 25 March 1911) was an English tenor best remembered today for creating the role of Alexis in the Gilbert and Sullivan comic opera The Sorcerer in 1877. As Giorgio Bentami he pursued a professional opera and concert career in Europe and Britain from 1868 to 1877. Alexis proved to be his last role.

== Early life ==
Bentham was born in York in 1843, the youngest child and only son of Captain (later Lieutenant-Colonel) John Bentham (died 1858), who served in the 6th Dragoon Guards and the 52nd (Oxfordshire) Regiment of Foot, among others, and his wife Emma Sophia (née Ikin). The family was well-connected and rich. Bentham gained a post in the War Office, and, being possessed of a fine tenor voice, by 1866 he became involved in amateur high society concerts, the first recorded being given by the Margate Volunteers at the local Assembly Rooms. Of his performance the local press wrote: "Rarely do concert-goers hear such a tenor as Mr Bentham ... his singing of 'The Message' was something superb." A few weeks later at Torquay he sang in a concert given by "The Wandering Minstrels", then the leading gentlemen's amateur singing club in Britain. Among his other appearances with the group was one the same season at the West London School of Art. Later the same year he appeared in a concert given by the Civil Service Musical Society at the Hanover Square Rooms in London, where a critic commented: "Besides possessing a voice to excite envy, Mr Bentham has real musical feeling and sings with expression as true as it is unaffected."

== Career ==
By 1868 Bentham, often performing as Signor Bentami, had become a professional singer in Europe and was appearing in Copenhagen, in Il Trovatore and Rigoletto, where his performance of the former was described as "a great surprise … a soft, sonorous, sympathetic voice ... intonation as pure as the sound of a silver bell". In October of that year, he was in Amsterdam, where English reports called him the "primo tenore in the opera of the city", and later that year he was a leading tenor at the Royal Swedish Opera in Stockholm for ten weeks. He next appeared in Italy.

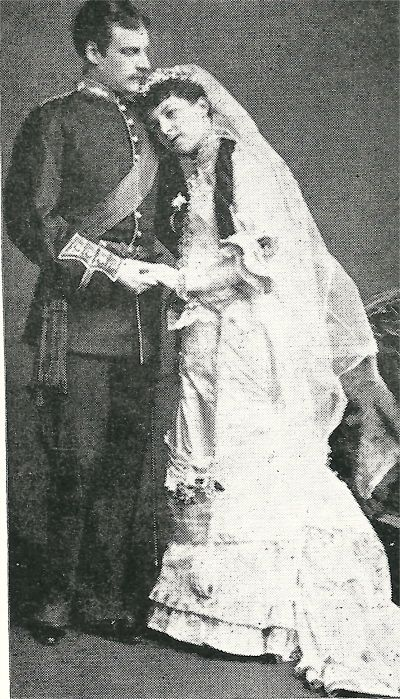
George Bentham as Alexis (left) and Giulia Warwick as Aline in The Sorcerer (1878)

He returned to Britain and signed a three-year contract with James Henry Mapleson. In Scotland, with Mapleson's Italian opera company in early 1871, he sang the roles of Count Almaviva in The Barber of Seville and Elvino in La sonnambula. The critic of The Glasgow Herald commented that despite the new tenor's palpable lack of stage experience, he was "a decided success", singing with "pure and refined taste … sweet, telling voice and gentlemanly bearing". Bentham made his London début in April 1871 in the role of Carlo in Linda di Chamounix. He was still billed as "Signor Bentami", but the London critics were not deceived, and after they made this clear he abandoned the pseudo-Italian stage name and appeared under his real name. He then appeared in various concerts alongside such London stars as Thérèse Tietjens and Sims Reeves. He returned to the operatic stage later that year playing Idreno in Semiramide at Her Majesty's Theatre. He soon sang Lionel in Martha. He also appeared that year at the Three Choirs Festival in Gloucester in violation of his Mapleson contract. On 8 September 1871 at All Saints Church in Kensington he married the 20 year-old mezzo-soprano Cecile Fernandez.

Back with Mapleson, in Dublin, Bentham appeared as Tamino in The Magic Flute while his new wife played Smeton in Anna Bolena. Again feuding with Mapleson, they sang together in concert in Dover, with The Hallé in Manchester and at The Crystal Palace in London, before departing to appear in Italy where, among other roles, he played the title role in Faust and she played Marguerita. Their son, Jack A. Bentham, was born in Florence in 1873. After this, the couple separated. On returning to London alone Bentham again appeared in Monday Pops and other London concerts, including at the Royal Albert Hall. In 1874 he returned to Mapleson at Her Majesty’s Theatre in the title role of Faust, to familiar reviews: "To be frank, there is yet something to acquire and something to discard ere Mr Bentham will take that position which his excellent voice should enable him to do ultimately." He next played Tamino in The Magic Flute. He returned to the Gloucester festival and was a soloist at the Liverpool Festival and the Leeds Music Festival, conducted by Sir Michael Costa, and also sang in Edinburgh that year. In early 1875 he sang in Elijah at the Royal Albert Hall, while in 1876 he toured with the Imperial Italian Opera Company, with whom he sang Alfredo in La Traviata, opposite Emma Howson. In early 1877, he sang in a starry concert party for Mapleson, earning warm reviews.

In November 1877 Bentham was engaged by Richard D'Oyly Carte to create the role of Alexis in Gilbert and Sullivan's comic opera, The Sorcerer, at the Opera Comique in London. His singing on the opening night was hampered by a bad cold, but even after he had recovered, the critics found his performance disappointing, marked by wooden acting and pallid characterisation. In March 1878, at Arthur Sullivan's request, he was asked to join Carte's touring company playing the opera in the British provinces; George Power took over the role of Alexis in London. Bentham played Alexis on tour until July 1878 when he left the company.

== Last years and death ==
Following this, at the age of 34, Bentham gave up his singing career. His wife and he apparently never reconciled and never divorced. She continued to perform as Madame Bentham-Fernandez, or Fernandez-Bentami, or under her maiden name, until at least 1913. Bentham died, aged 67, a man of "independent means and no fixed abode", at the Strand Palace Hotel in 1911 from fatty degeneration of the heart leading to a sudden heart failure. Although he had the disease for some years, his death certificate reports that he had been ill "for a few minutes".

== Sources ==
- Joseph, Tony (1994). D'Oyly Carte Opera Company, 1875–1982: An Unofficial History. London: Bunthorne Books. ISBN 978-0-9507992-1-6.
- Rollins, Cyril; R. John Witts (1961). The D'Oyly Carte Opera Company in Gilbert and Sullivan Operas. London: Michael Joseph, Ltd. OCLC 1317843.
- Young, Percy M. (1971). Sir Arthur Sullivan. London: J. M. Dent & Sons. ISBN 978-0-460-03934-5.
