= San Sebastián =

City in the Basque Country, Spain

Donostia / San Sebastián Donostia (Basque) San Sebastián (Spanish)
- Municipality
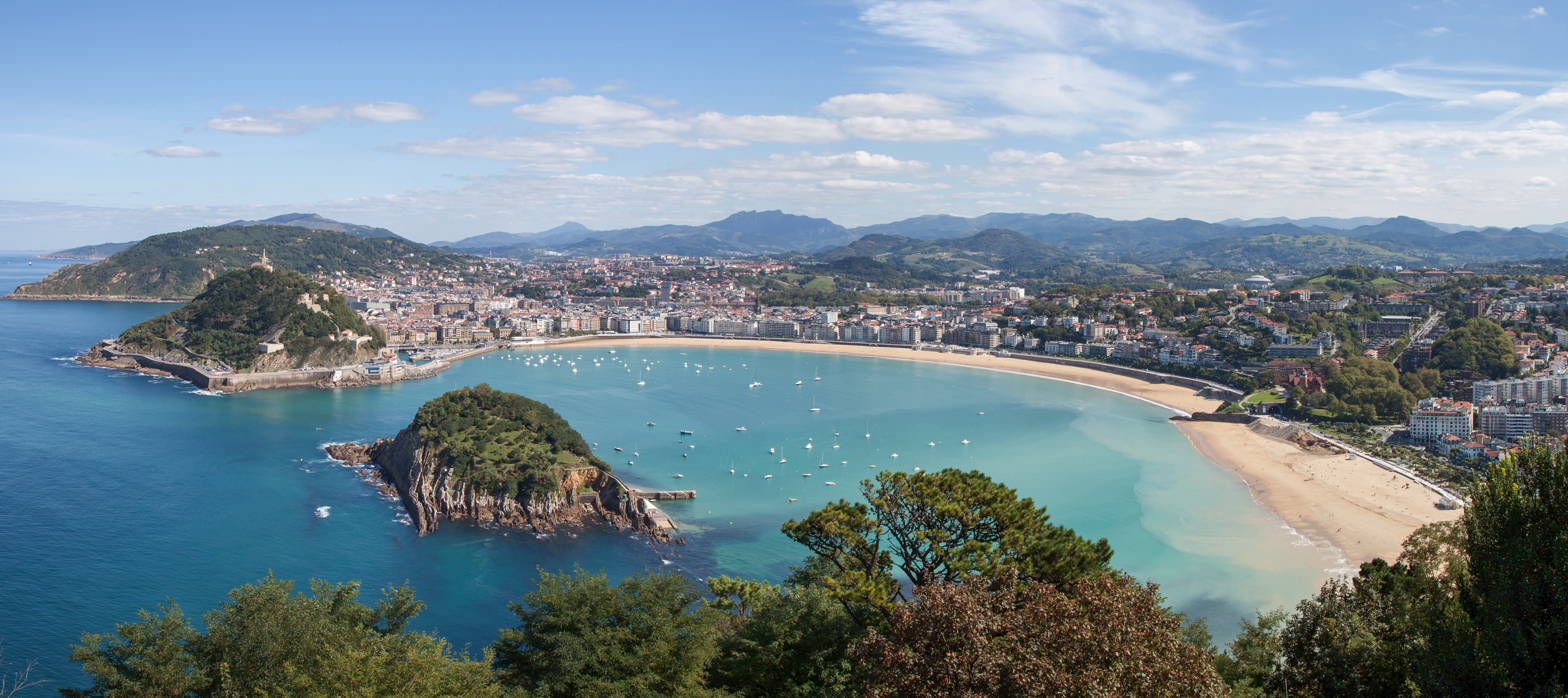
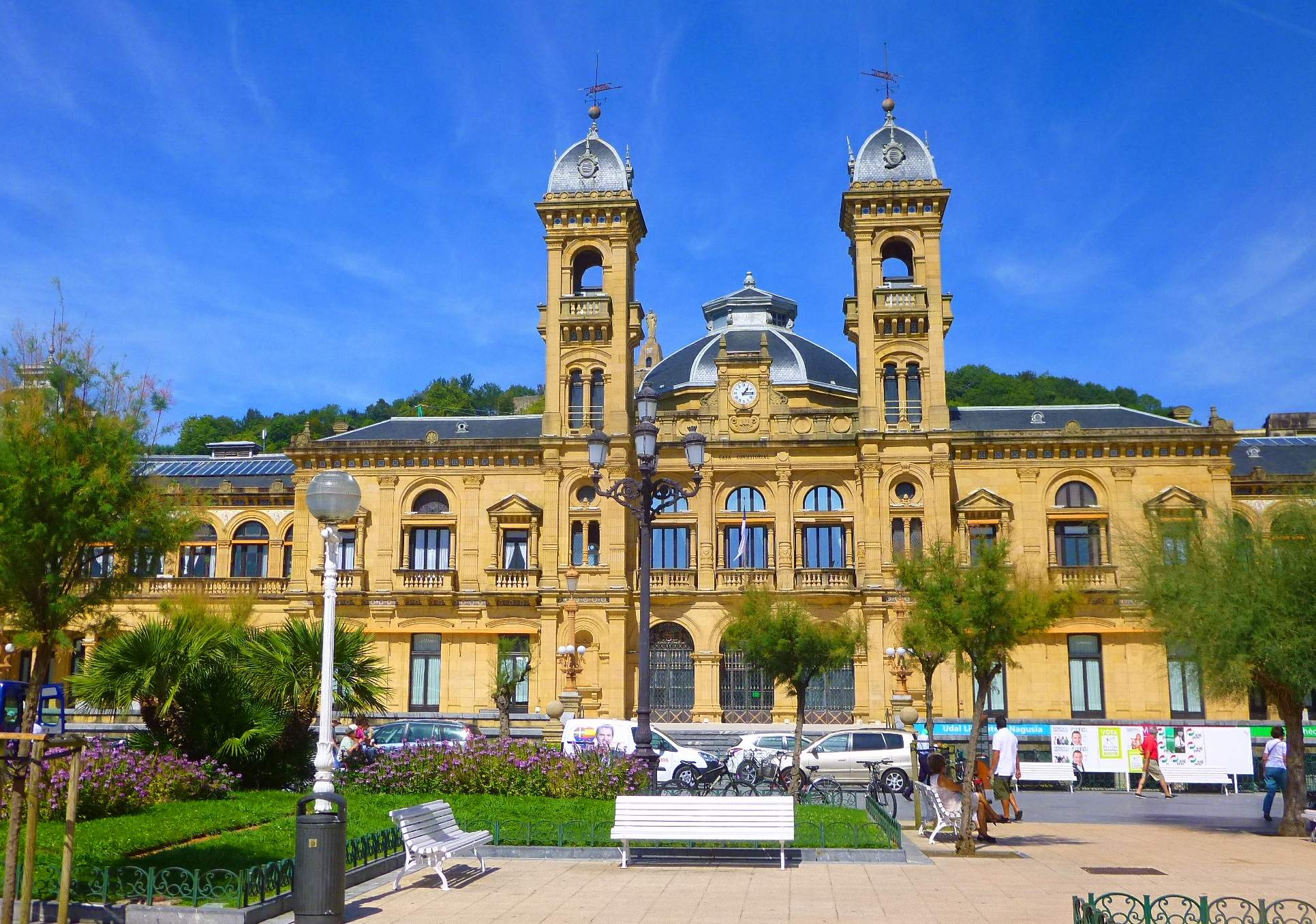
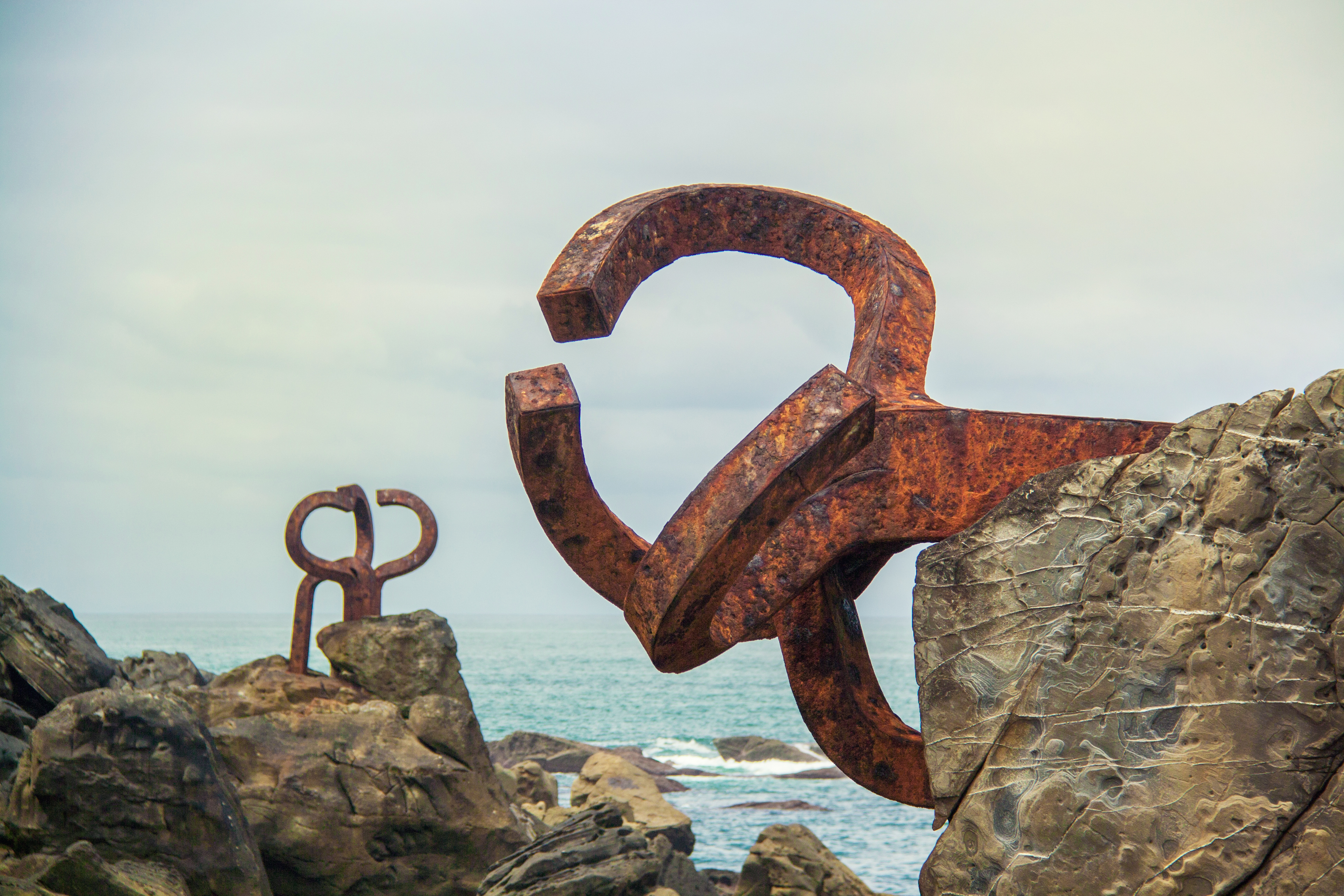
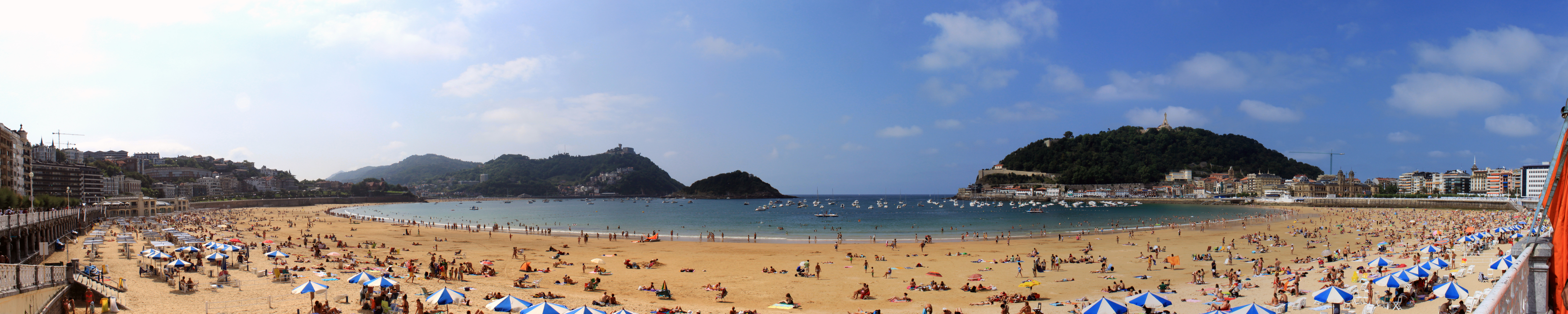
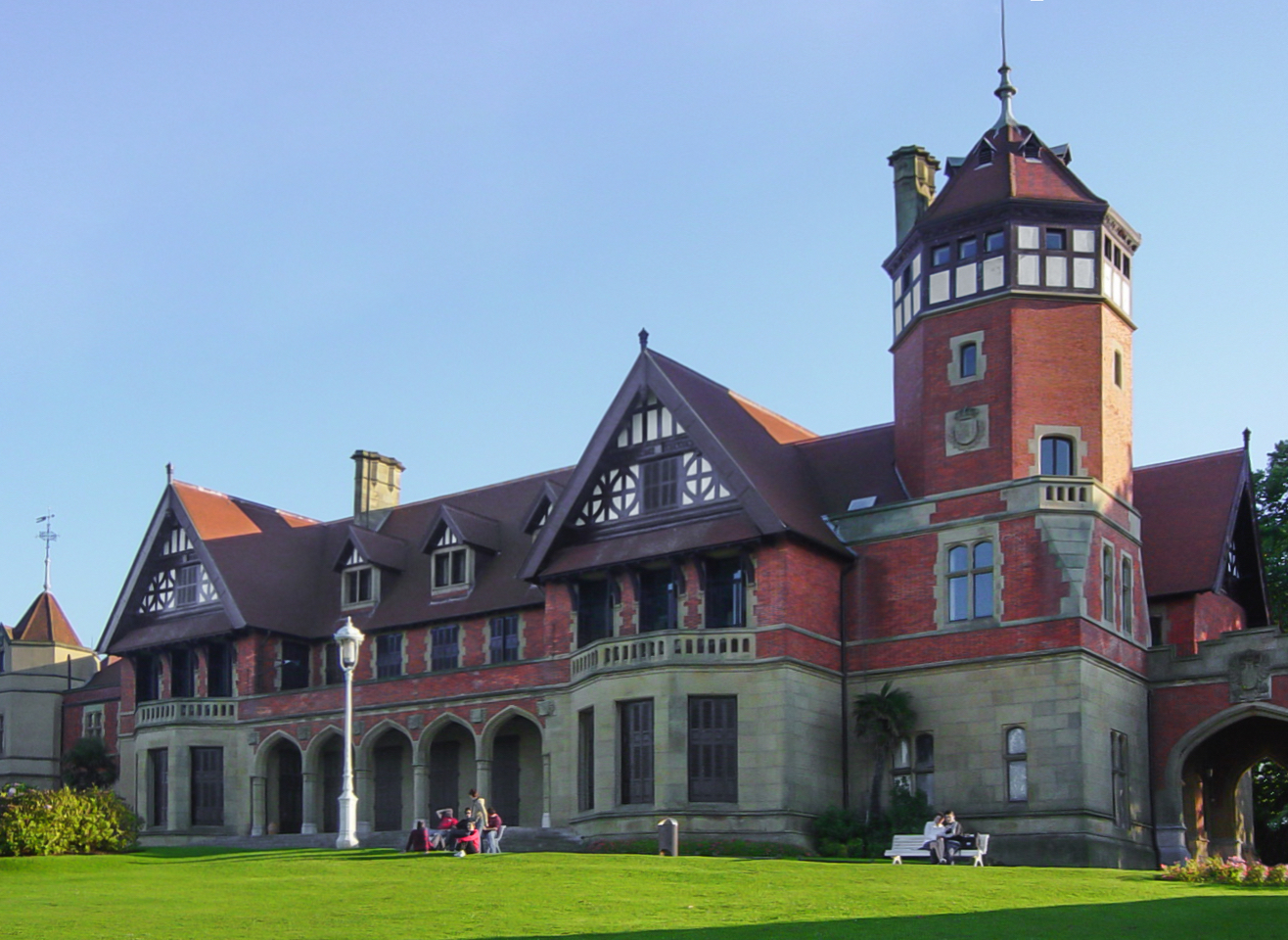
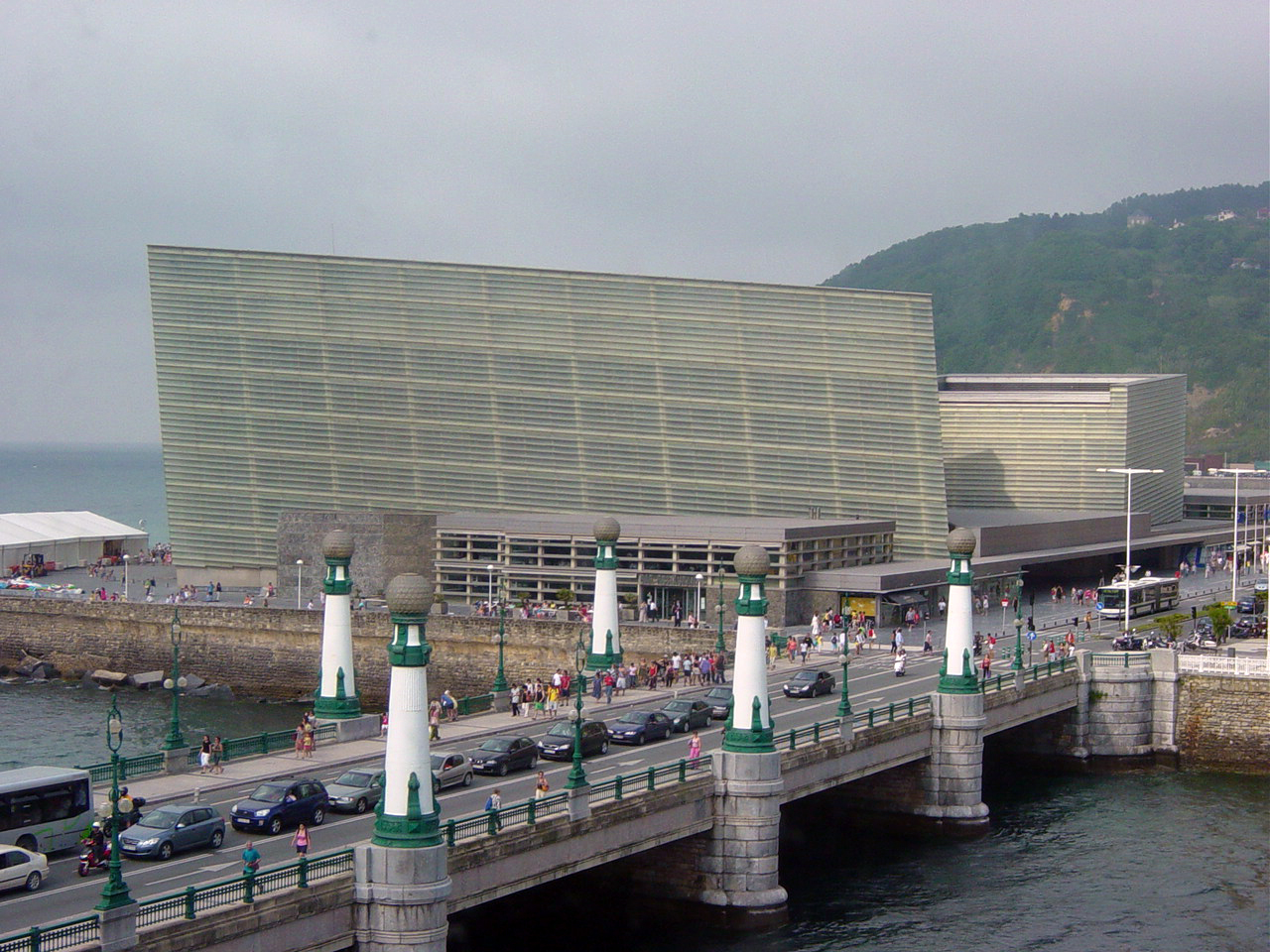
- La Concha bay City Hall The Comb of the Wind Beach of La Concha Miramar Palace Kursaal

- Flag Coat of arms
- Nicknames: Sanse, Donosti, San Seb, la bella Easo (Note: The title of la bella Easo ("the beautiful Easo") comes from a 19th-century identification of the town as the Roman port of Oiasso. But following the archaeological findings at the end of the 20th century, Irun, some 18 km (11 mi) east, has been identified as the location of Oiasso.)
- Motto: Ganadas por fidelidad, Nobleza y lealtad (Spanish for "Earned for Fidelity, Nobility and Loyalty")
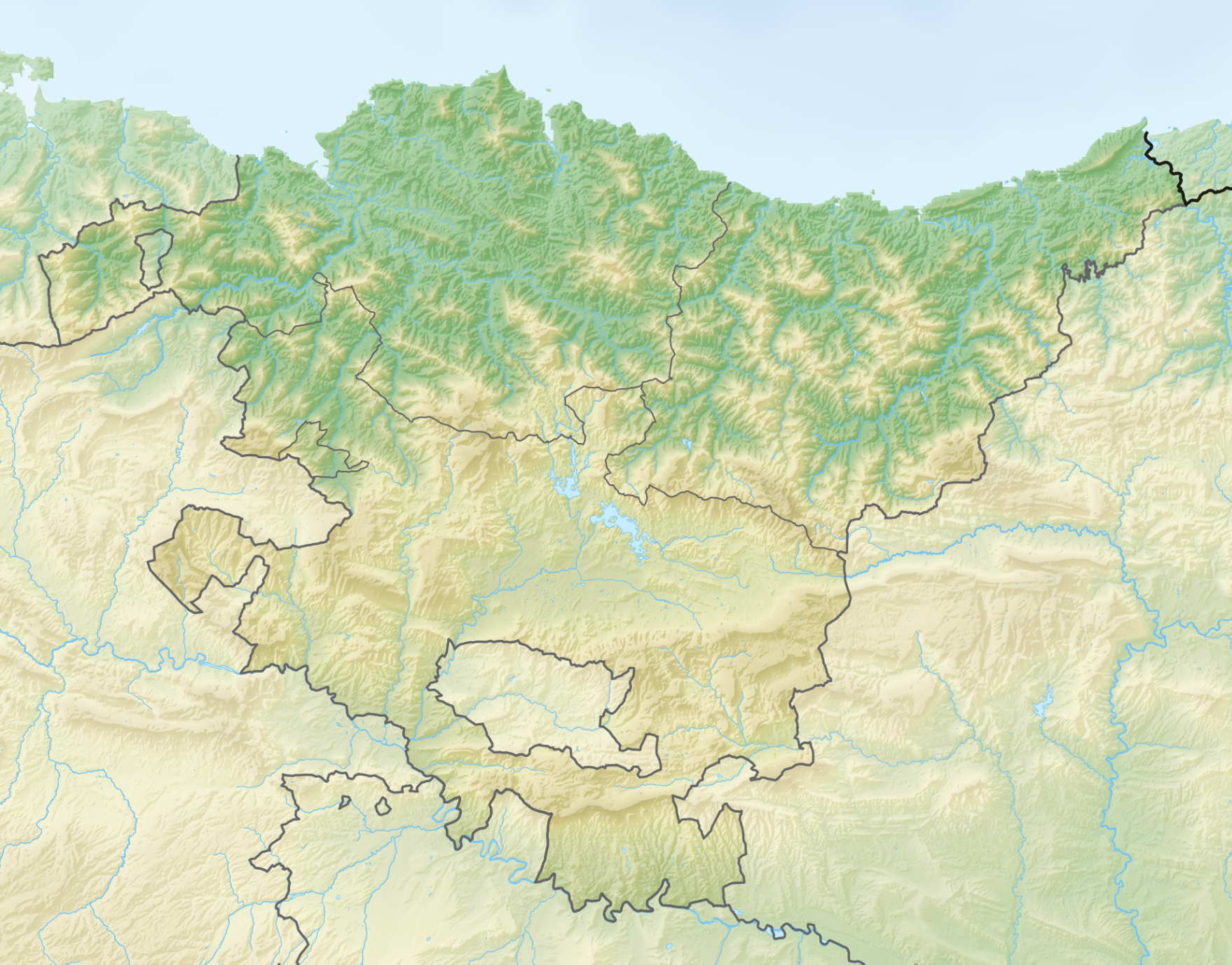
- Location of Donostia / San Sebastián within the Basque Autonomous Community Donostia / San Sebastián (Spain)
- Coordinates: 43°19′17″N 1°59′8″W
- Country: Spain
- Autonomous community: Basque Country
- Province: Gipuzkoa
- Eskualdea: Donostialdea
- Neighbourhoods: 21
- Founded: 1180

Government
  - Mayor: Jon Insausti (EAJ-PNV)

Area
  - Municipality: 60.89 km^{2} (23.51 sq mi)
- Elevation: 6 m (20 ft)

Population (2024)
  - Municipality: 188,487
  - Rank: 35th in Spain
  - Density: 3,096/km^{2} (8,017/sq mi)
  - Metro: 436,500
- Demonyms: Donostiarra, -s • donostiar, -rak (Bas.) • donostiarra, -s (Sp.)

GDP
  - Metro: €21.797 billion (2020)
- Time zone: UTC+1 (CET)
  - Summer (DST): UTC+2 (CEST)
- Postal codes: 20001–20018
- Area code: +34 943 (Gipuzkoa)
- Website: City Council

San Sebastián or Donostia, officially known by the bilingual name Donostia / San Sebastián (Basque: [doˈnos̺ti.a], Spanish: [san seβasˈtjan]), is a city and municipality located in the Basque Autonomous Community in Spain. It lies on the coast of the Bay of Biscay, 20 km (12 miles) from the Spain–France border. The capital city of the province of Gipuzkoa, it has a population of 188,487 as of 2024, with its metropolitan area being 436,500 in 2010. Locals call themselves donostiarra (singular) in Basque, also using this term when speaking in Spanish. It is also a part of Basque Eurocity Bayonne-San Sebastián.

The economic activities in the city are dominated by the service sector, with an emphasis on commerce and tourism, as San Sebastián has long been well-known as a tourist destination. Despite the city's relatively small size, events such as the San Sebastián International Film Festival and the San Sebastian Jazz Festival have given it an international dimension. San Sebastián, along with Wrocław, Poland, was the European Capital of Culture in 2016.

== Etymology ==
In spite of appearance, both the Basque form Donostia and the Spanish form San Sebastián have the same meaning — Saint Sebastian. The dona/done/doni element in Basque place names signifies "saint" and is derived from Latin domine; the second part of Donostia contains a shortened form of the saint's name. There are two hypotheses regarding the evolution of the Basque name: one says it was *Done Sebastiáne > Donasa(b)astiai > Donasastia > Donastia > Donostia, the other one says it was *Done Sebastiane > *Done Sebastiae > *Done Sebastie > *Donesebastia > *Donasastia > *Donastia > Donostia.

== History ==
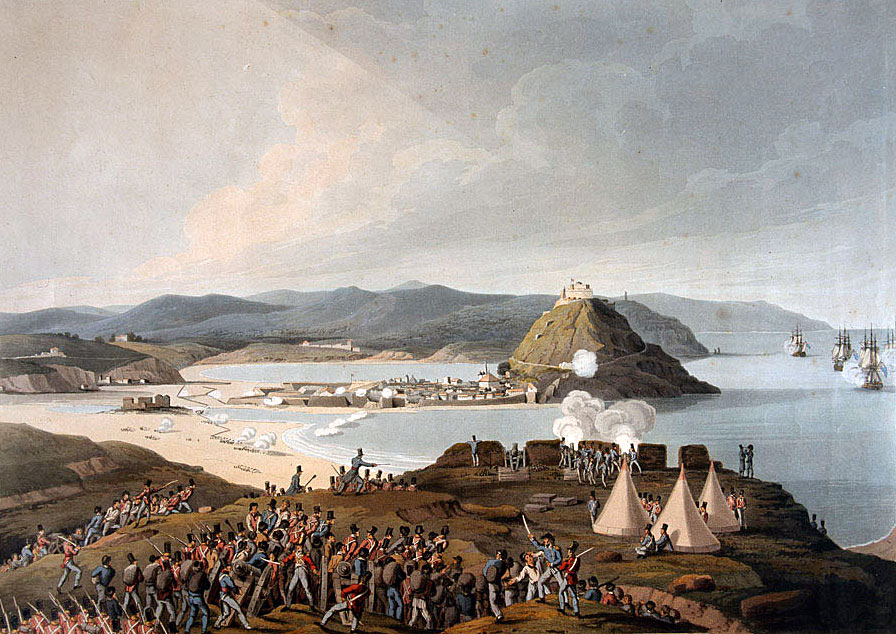
British siege of San Sebastián in 1813

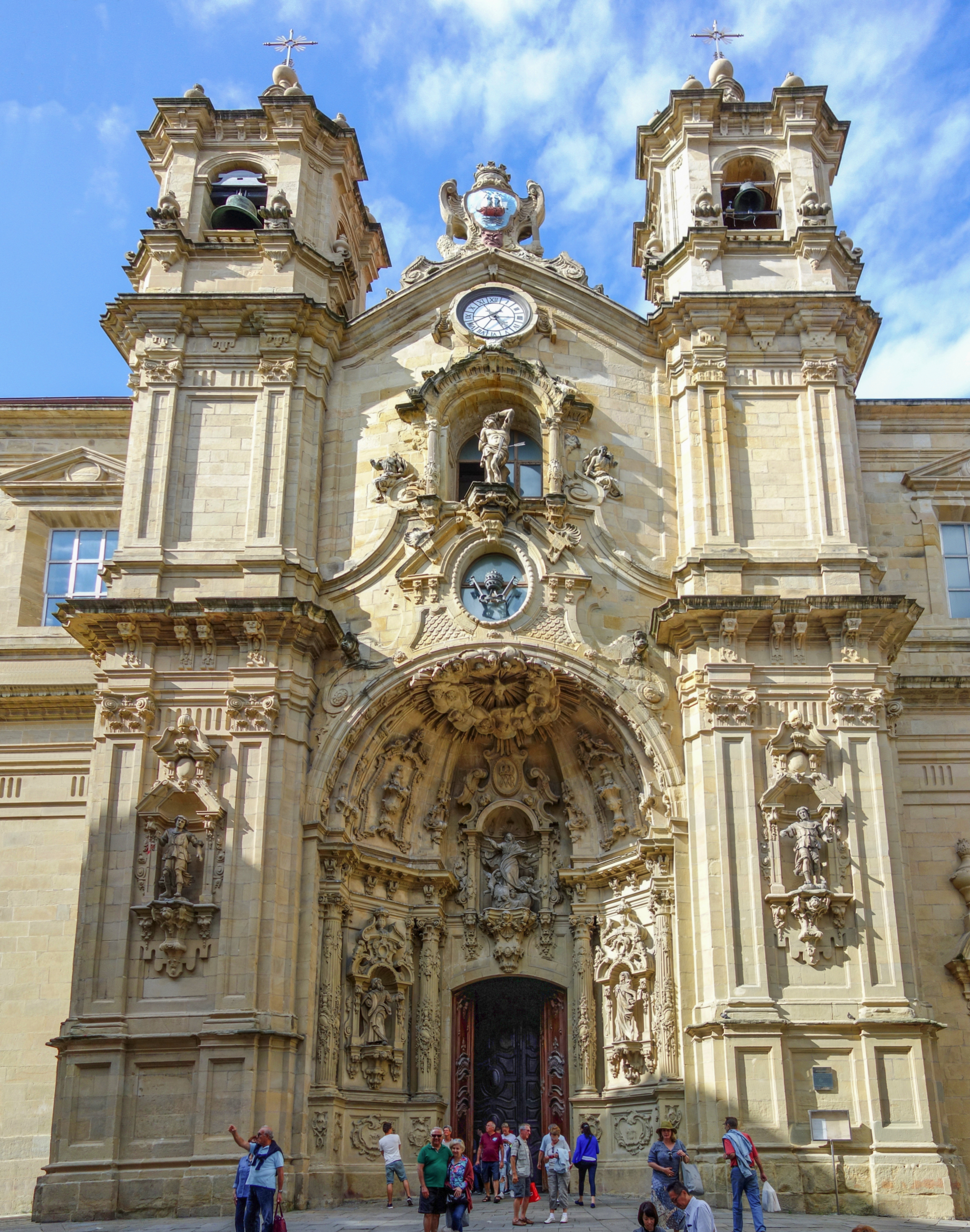
Basilica of Saint Mary of the Chorus

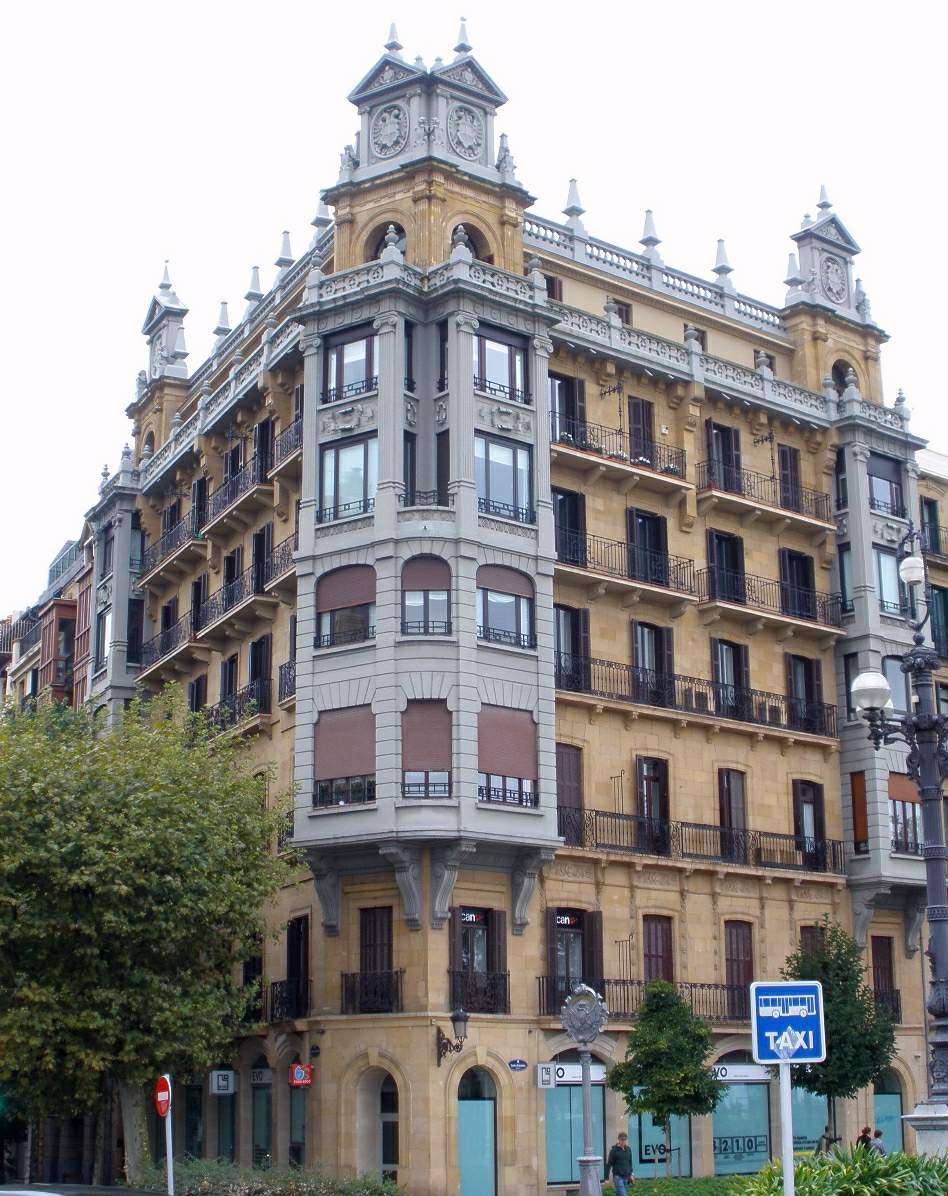
Early 20th century residential building (city centre)

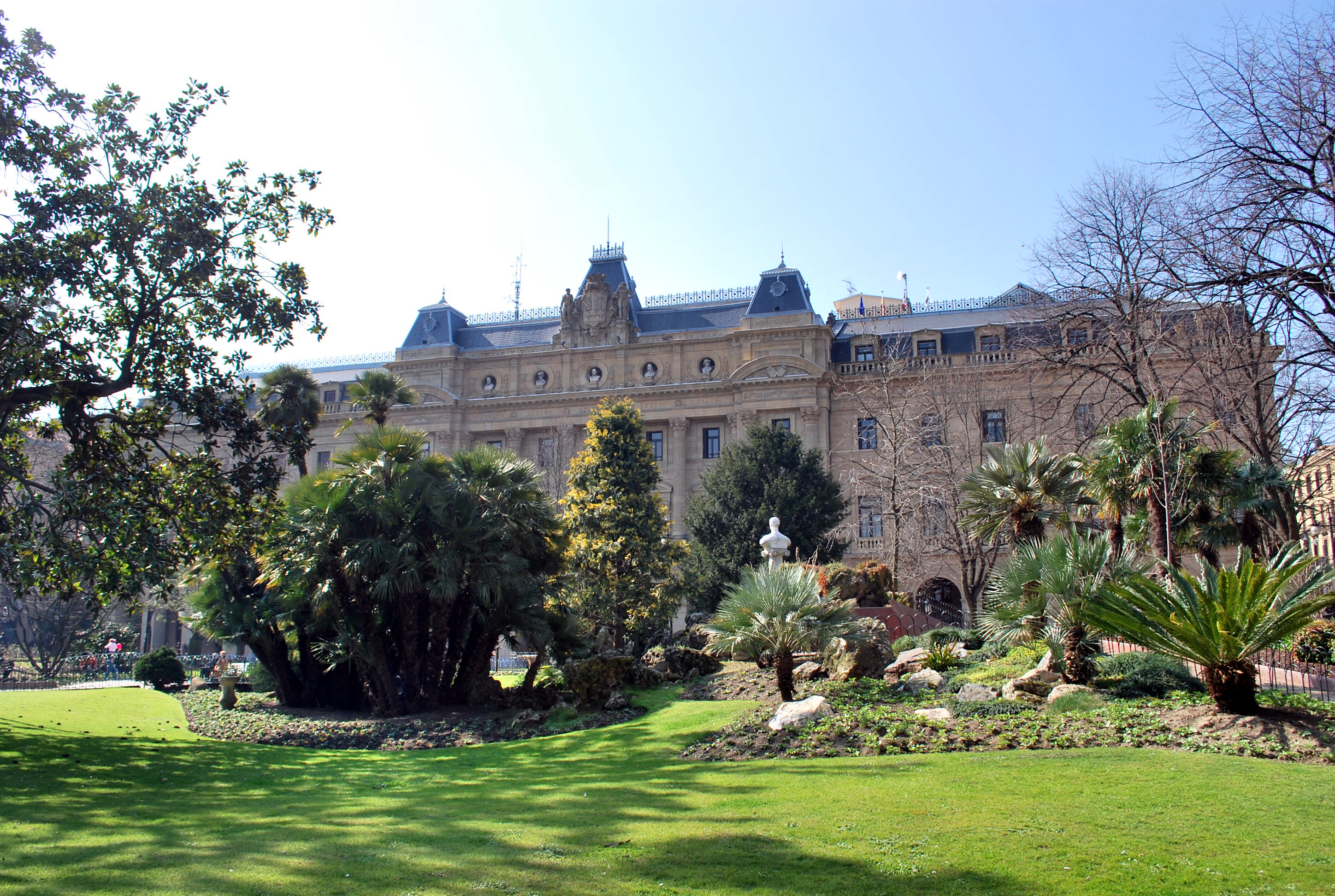
Venue of the Regional Government in the Gipuzkoa Plaza

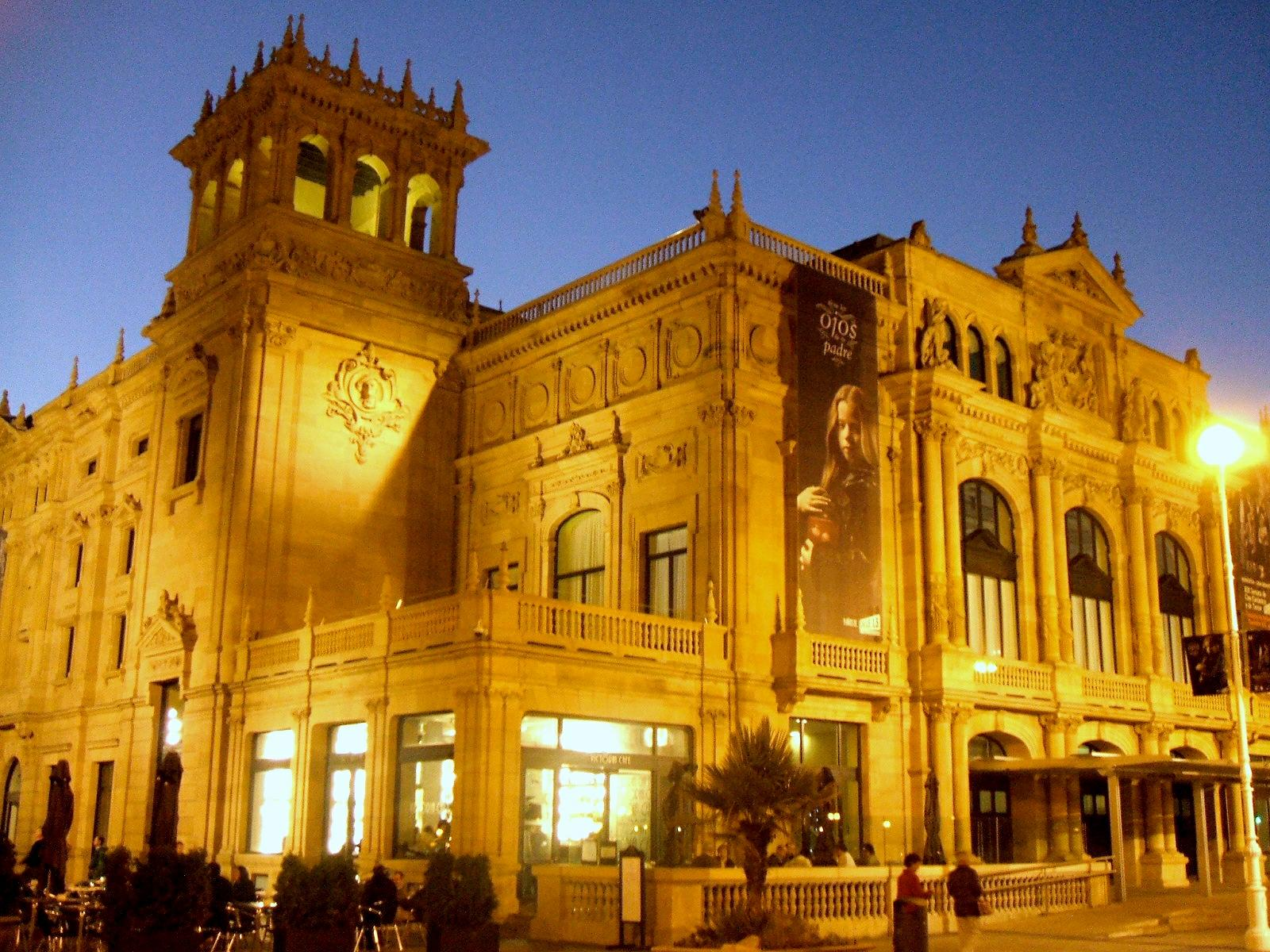
Victoria Eugenia Theatre at night

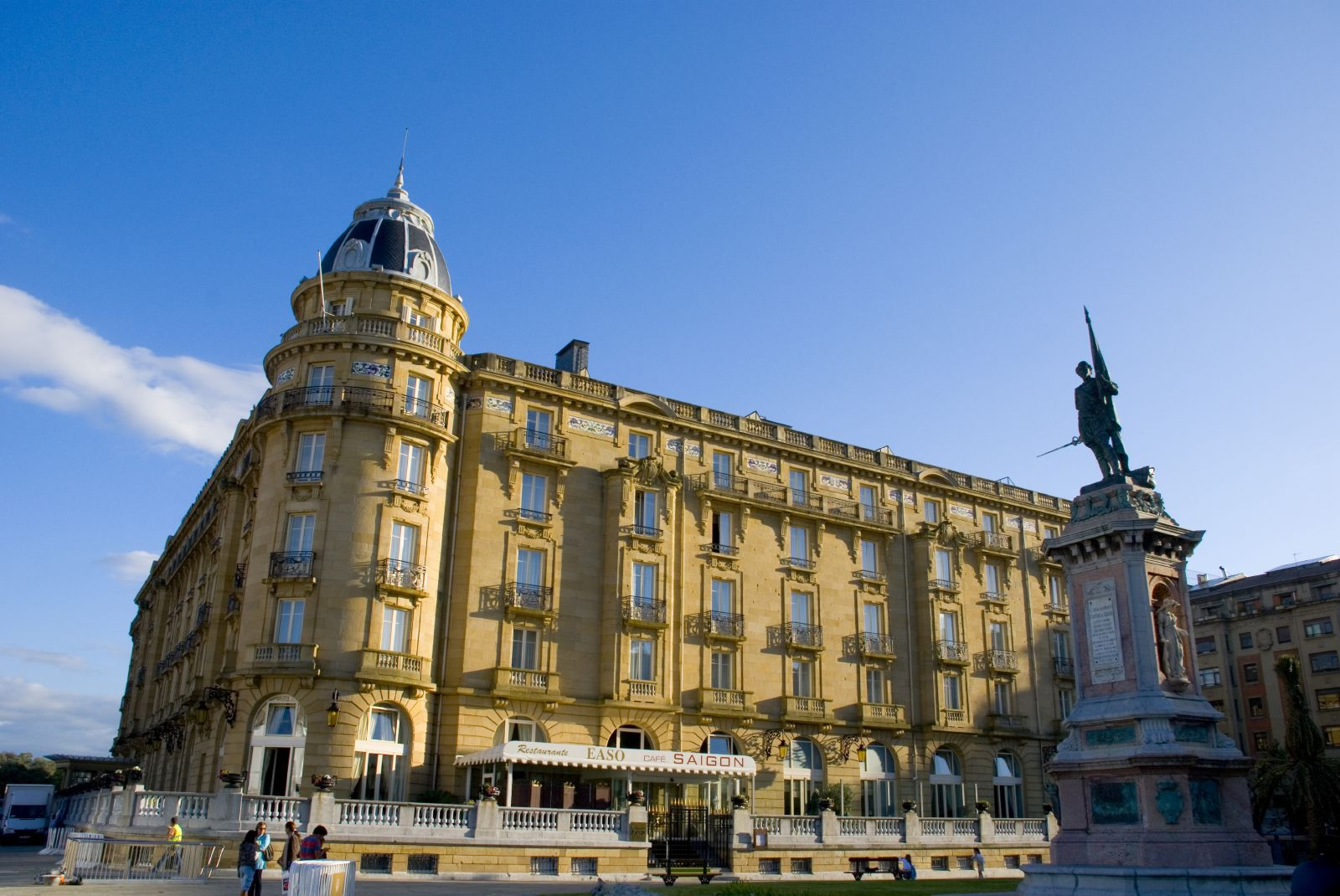
Maria Cristina Hotel

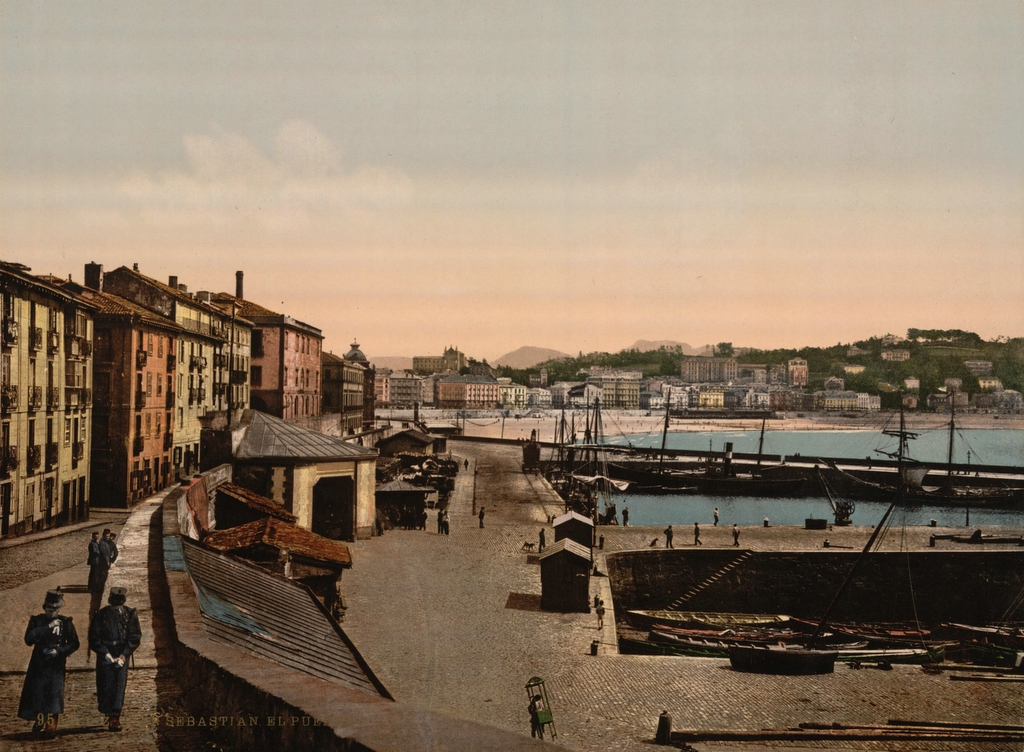
Port of San Sebastián in 1890

Igeldo Lighthouse

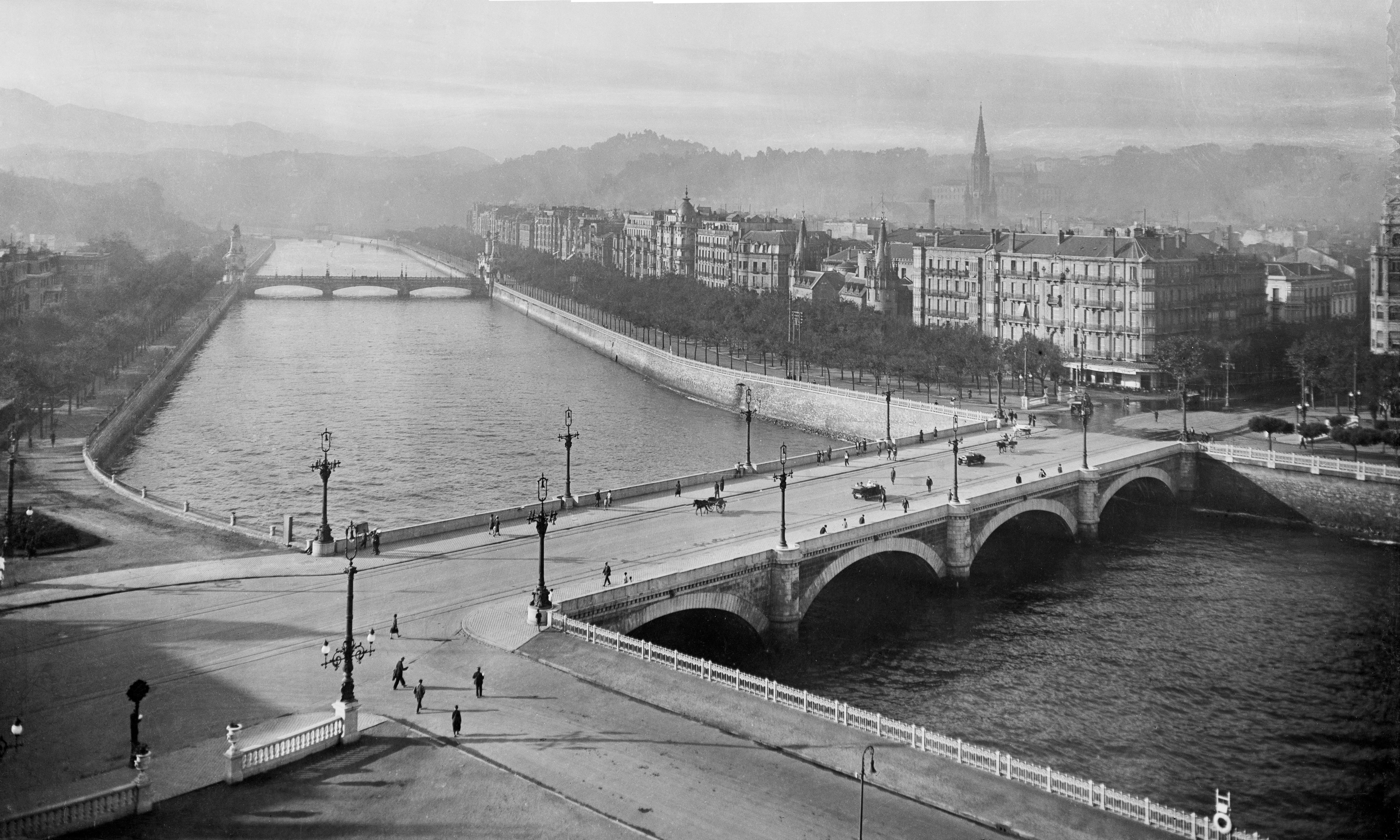
Santa Catalina Bridge after erection of the Maria Cristina Bridge (1905–1910)

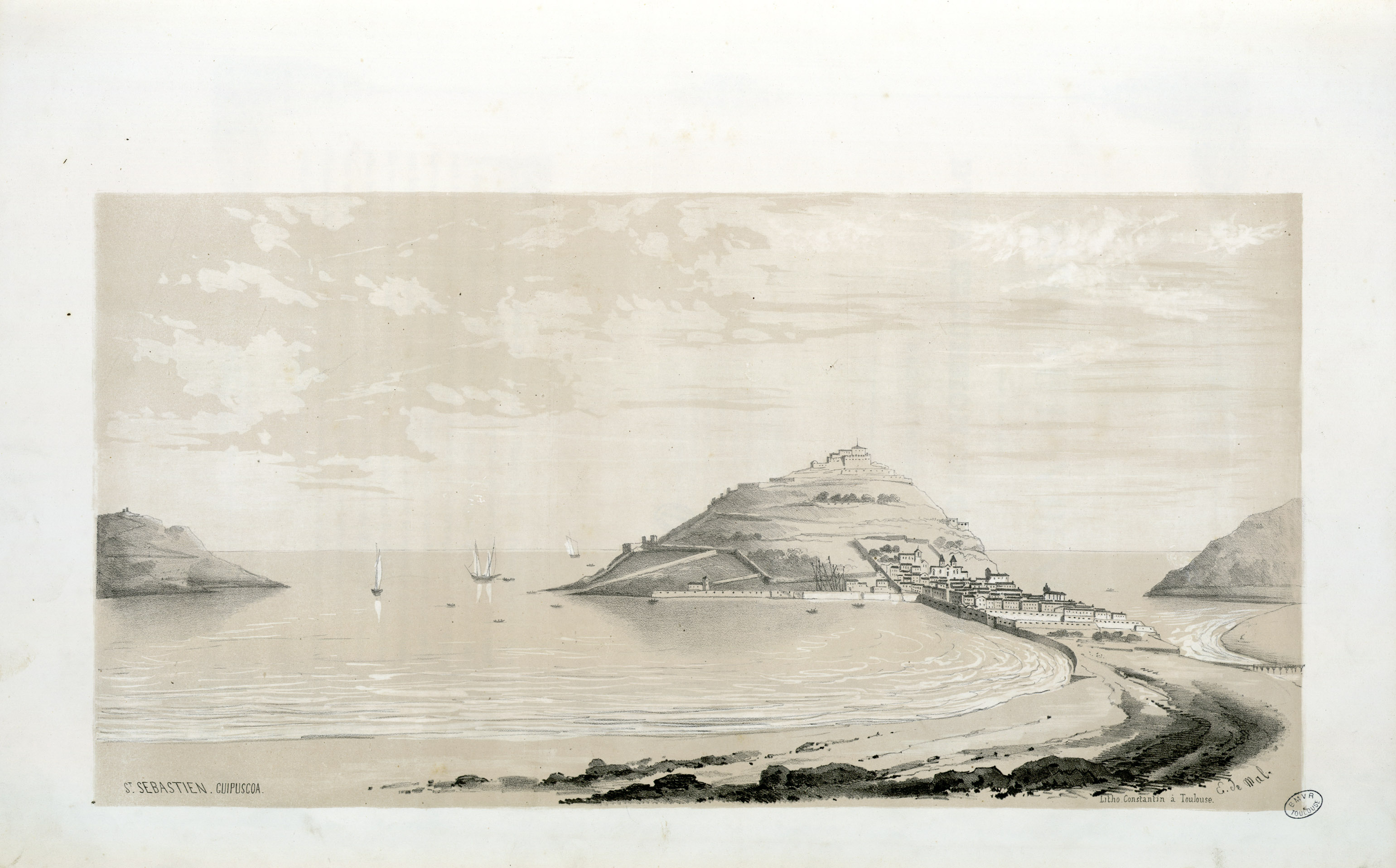
San Sebastián in 1843, by Eugène de Malbos

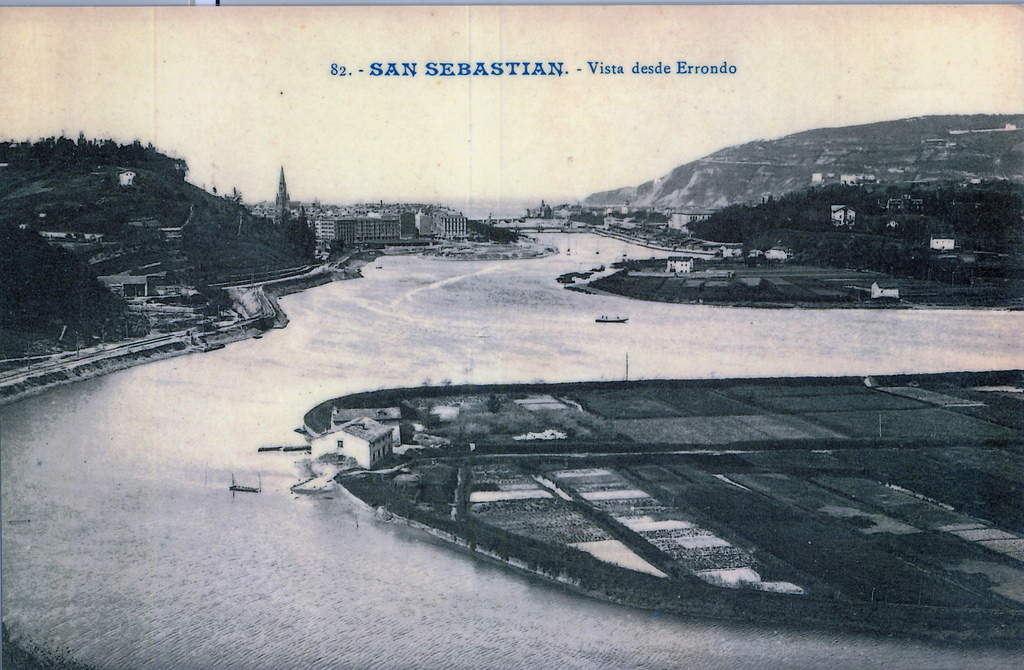
Donostia's Amara before river canalization in the mid 20th century

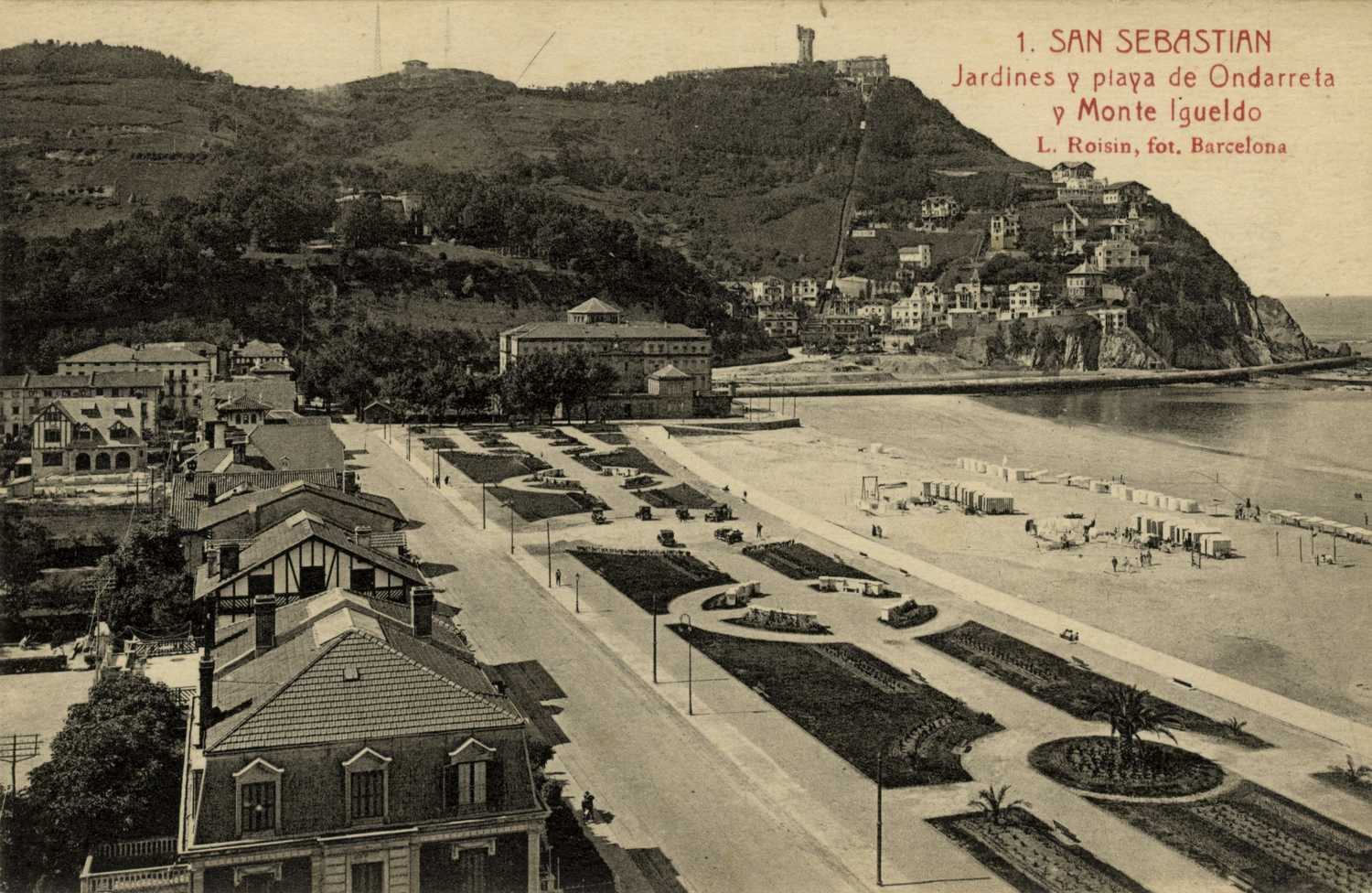
Ondarreta gardens, and former prison by the beach (far background)

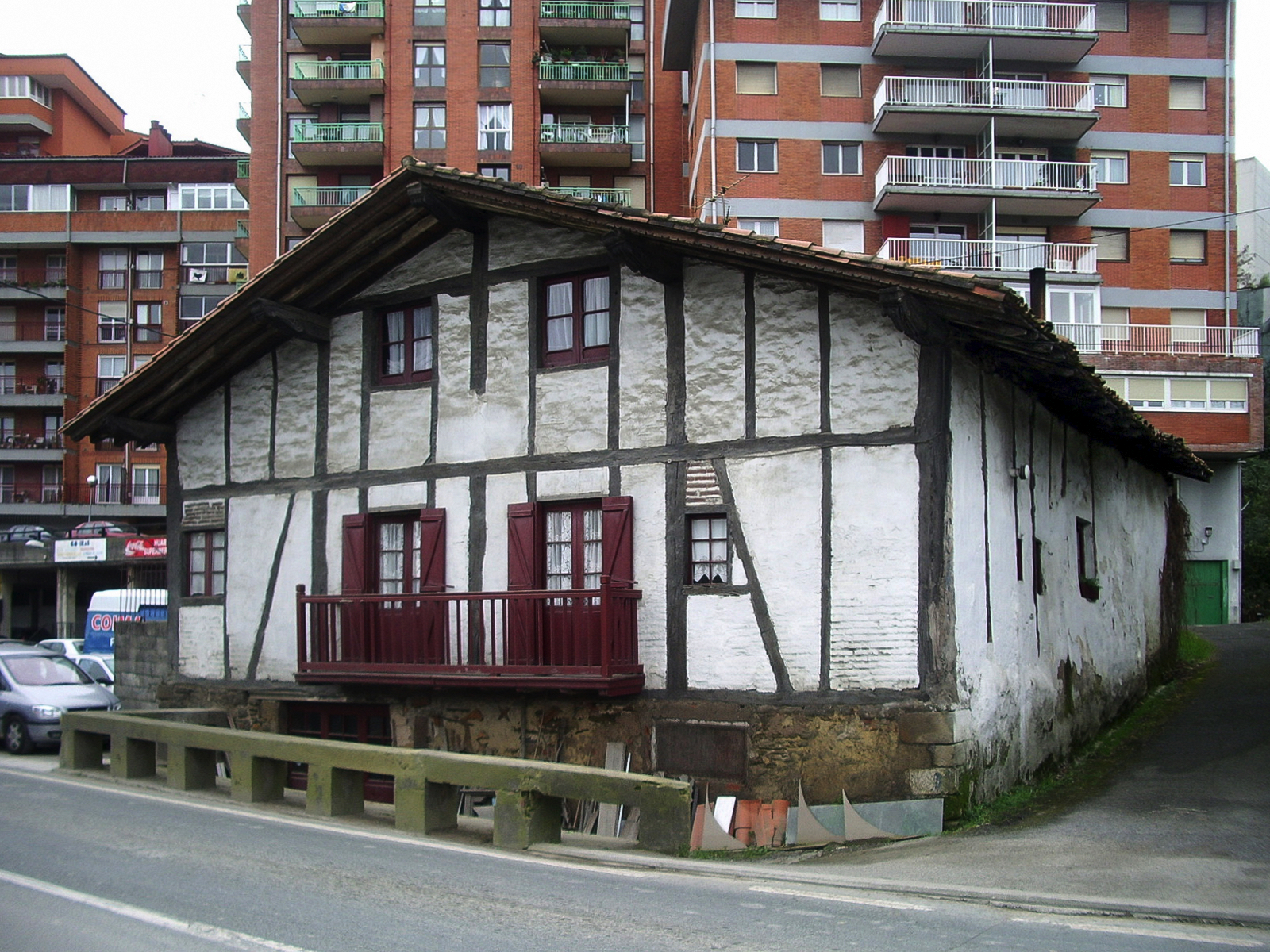
Outlying rural areas were absorbed during the 1960s (Loiola)

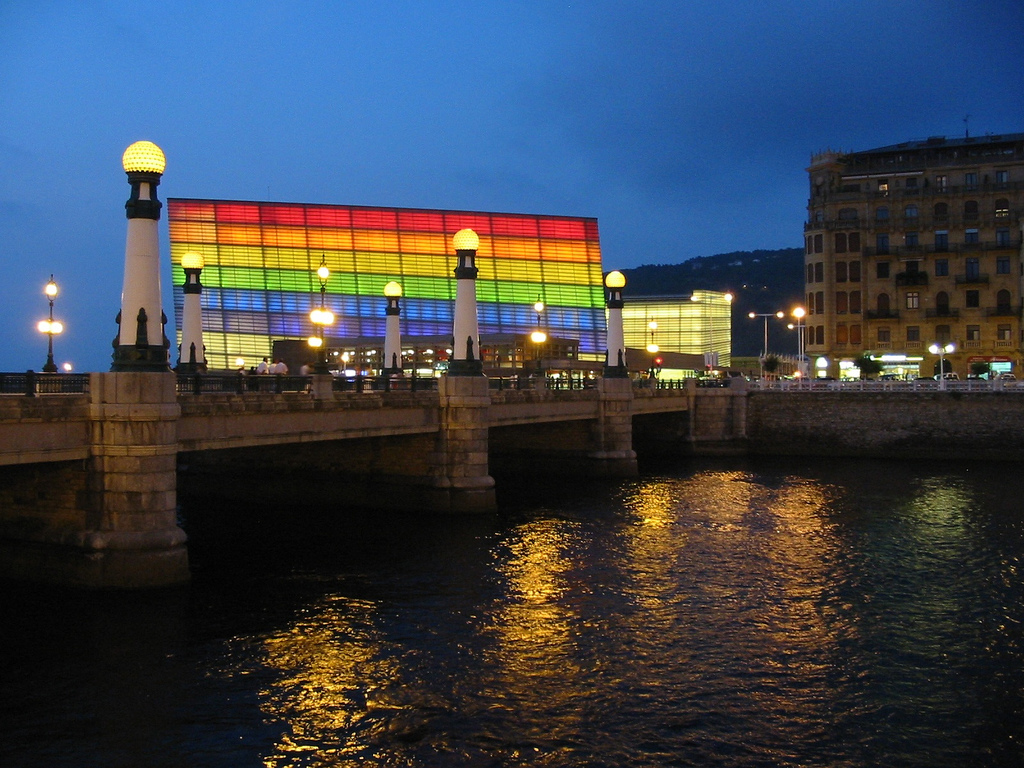
Kursaal Congress Centre and Zurriola Bridge over the Urumea river

=== Prehistory ===
The first evidence of human stationary presence in the current city is the settlement of Ametzagaña, between South Intxaurrondo and Astigarraga. The unearthed remains, such as knapped stones used as knives to cut animal skin, date from 24,000 to 22,000 BC. The open-air findings of the Upper Paleolithic have revealed that the settlers were modern human (Homo sapiens) hunters, besides pointing to a much colder climate at the time.

=== Antiquity ===
There were Roman settlements (from around 50–200 AD) in what is now the Old Part of the city, according to excavations carried out in the convent of Santa Teresa, on the slopes of Urgull.

San Sebastián is thought to have been in the territory of the Varduli tribe in the Roman times. The Basque Roman town of Oiasso (Irun), 10 km (6 mi) east of the current city, was subsequently incorrectly identified with San Sebastián for some time by many historians.

=== Middle Ages ===
No written records about the place are known until, in 1014, the monastery of Saint Sebastian with its apple orchards for cider production, then located within the boundaries of the town of Hernani, was reportedly donated to the Abbey of Leire by Sancho III of Iruñea. By 1181, the city was chartered (given the fuero) by king Sancho VI of Pamplona on the site of Izurum, having jurisdiction over all the territory between the rivers Oria and Bidasoa.

In 1200, the city was conquered by Castile, whose king Alfonso VIII, confirmed its charter (fuero), but the Kingdom of Navarre was deprived of its main direct access out to the sea. Perhaps as soon as 1204 (or earlier), the city nucleus at the foot of Urgull started to be populated with Gascon-speaking colonizers from Bayonne and beyond, who left an important imprint in the city's identity in the centuries to come.

In 1265, the use of the city as a seaport was granted to Navarre as part of a wedding pact. The large quantity of Gascons inhabiting the town favoured the development of trade with other European ports and Gascony. The city steered clear of the destructive War of the Bands in Gipuzkoa, the only town in doing so in that territory. In fact, the town only joined Gipuzkoa in 1459 after the war came to an end. Up to the 16th century, Donostia remained mostly out of wars, but by the beginning of the 15th century, a line of walls of simple construction is attested encircling the town. The last chapter of the town in the Middle Ages was brought about by a fire that devastated Donostia in 1489. After burning to the ground, the town began a new renaissance by building up mainly with stone instead of bare timber.

=== Modern Age ===
The advent of the Modern Age brought a period of instability and war for the city. New state boundaries were drawn that left Donostia located close to Spain's border with France; thicker and more sophisticated walls were erected, with the town becoming involved in the 1521–1524 military campaigns that formed part of the Spanish conquest of Navarre. The town provided critical naval help to Emperor Charles V during the siege of Hondarribia, which earned the town the titles "Muy Noble y Muy Leal", recorded on its coat of arms. The town also aided the monarch by sending a party to the Battle of Noain and providing help to quash the Revolt of the Comuneros in 1521.

After these events, Gascons, who had played a leading role in the political and economic life of the town since its foundation, began to be excluded from influential public positions by means of a string of regional sentences upheld by royal decision (regional diets of Zestoa 1527, Hondarribia 1557, Bergara 1558, Tolosa 1604 and Deba 1662). Meanwhile, the climate of war and disease left the town in a poor condition that drove many fishermen and traders to take to the sea as corsairs as a way of getting a living, most of the times under the auspices of the king Philip II of Spain, who benefited from the disruption caused to and wealth obtained from the French and Dutch trade ships.

In 1660, the city was used as the royal headquarters during the marriage of the Infanta to Louis XIV at Saint-Jean-de-Luz nearby. After a relatively peaceful 17th century, the town was besieged and taken over by the troops of the French Duke of Berwick up to 1721. However, San Sebastián was not spared by shelling in the French assault and many urban structures were reconstructed, e.g. a new opening in the middle of the town, the Plaza Berria (that was to become the current Konstituzio Plaza).

In 1728, the Guipuzcoan Company of Caracas was founded and boosted commerce with the Americas. Thanks to the profit the company generated, the town underwent some urban reforms and improvements and the new Santa Maria Church was erected by subscription. This period of wealth and development was to last up to the end of 18th century.

In 1808, Napoleonic forces captured San Sebastián in the Peninsular War. In 1813, after a siege of various weeks, on 28 August, during the night, a landing party from a British Royal Navy squadron captured Santa Clara Island, in the bay. Situated on a narrow promontory that jutted out into the sea between the waters of the Bay of Biscay and the broad estuary of the Urumea River, the town was hard to get at and well fortified – "it was the strongest fortification I ever saw, Gibraltar excepted", wrote William Dent. Three days later, on 31 August, British and Portuguese troops besieging San Sebastián assaulted the town. The relieving troops ransacked and burnt the city to the ground. Only the street at the foot of the hill (now called 31 August Street) remained.

=== Contemporary history ===
After these destructive events, reconstruction of the city was commenced in the original location with a slightly altered layout. A modern octagonal layout as drafted by the architect P.M. Ugartemendia was turned down and eventually M. Gogorza's blueprint was approved, then supervised and implemented by the Ugartemendia. This area, the old town, has a neoclassical, austere and systematic style of architectural construction. Constitution Square was built in 1817 and the town hall (currently a library) between 1828 and 1832. Housing in the old town was built gradually alongside the rest of the area.

The liberal and bourgeois San Sebastián became the capital of Gipuzkoa (instead of Tolosa) until 1823, when absolutists besieged the town (only 200 inhabitants remained in the town when the offensive troops entered). It was designated again as the capital in 1854. In 1835-6, the British Auxiliary Legion under Sir George de Lacy Evans defended the town against the Carlist besiegers. Some of those who died were buried in the English Cemetery on Mount Urgull.

At the beginning of the 19th century, the local government was still ruled by the principle of nobility, while inhabitants of foreign origin or descent had always been numerous in the town, especially among the trading community. Although San Sebastián benefited greatly from the charter system established in the Southern Basque Country (foruak, with borders in the Ebro river and no duties for overseas goods), the town was at odds with the more traditional Gipuzkoa, even requesting secession from the province and annexation to Navarre in 1841.

In 1863, the defensive walls of the town were demolished (their remains are visible in the underground car park on the Boulevard) and an expansion of the town began in an attempt to move on from its previous military function. Jose Goicoa and Ramon Cortazar were appointed to oversee the work. They modelled the new city according to an orthogonal shape in a neoclassical Parisian style, and Goicoa designed several elegant buildings, such as the Miramar Palace and La Concha Promenade. The city was chosen by the Spanish monarchy as a summer retreat following the French example of nearby Biarritz, and Spanish nobility and the diplomatic corps opened residences in the town. As the "wave baths" at La Concha were in conflict with nearby shipbuilding activity, the shipyards relocated to Pasaia, a nearby bay that had formerly been part of San Sebastián.

However, in 1875, war came to the town again, and in 1876 shelling over the city by Carlists claimed the life of acclaimed poet Bilintx. From 1885, King Alfonso XII of Spain's widow Maria Cristina spent every summer in Donostia along with her retinue, staying at the Miramar Palace. In 1887, a casino was built, which eventually became the current city hall, and some time later the Regional Government building was completed in Plaza Gipuzkoa following Jose Goicoa's design. Cultural life thrived in this period, giving rise to various events that still take place in the city, such as the Caldereros or the Tamborrada, and journalistic and literary works in both Spanish and Basque.

After much debate in the city over whether to pursue an economy based on tourism or manufacturing, Donostia developed into a fully-fledged seaside resort, but some industry developed in the district of Antiguo and on the outskirts of the city. Following the outbreak of World War I, San Sebastián became a destination for renowned international figures of culture and politics, including Mata Hari, Leon Trotsky, Maurice Ravel, and Romanones.

San Sebastián was one of earliest towns hit by the 1918 Influenza epidemic, dealing with a first wave outbreak in February of that year. Officials feared for the city's reputation and attempted to keep the disease's spread quiet, to no avail, and the outbreak soon spread throughout Spain.

Various rationalist architectural works, typically white or light-coloured, were built in the 1920s and 1930s, such as La Equitativa, Nautico, and Easo. In 1924–1926, canalisation work was carried out on the Urumea river at the southern edge of the city. However, after the city's Belle Epoque in the European wartime, repression under Miguel Primo de Rivera's dictatorship was not favourable for the city. In 1924, gambling was prohibited by the authoritarian regime, causing existential problems for the Grand Casino and the Kursaal (1921).

In 1930, Spanish republican forces signed up to the Pact of San Sebastián, leading to the Second Spanish Republic. Unrest and repression did not stop with the new political regime, and large-scale industrial action was called several times by the growing anarchist, communist and socialist unions. The 1936 military coup was initially defeated by the resistance, led by the Basque Nationalists, anarchists and communists, but later that same year the province fell to Spanish Nationalist forces during the Northern Campaign. The occupation proved disastrous for the city's residents. Between 1936 and 1943, 485 people were executed as a result of show trials by the Spanish Nationalists (Requetés and Falangists). It has been estimated that extrajudicial executions (paseos) by the occupying military forces accounted for over 600 murders in the area during the first months of occupation. Many children were evacuated to temporary safety in Bilbao, with the city's population falling by an estimated 40,000 to 50,000 inhabitants.

In the aftermath of war, the city was stricken by poverty, famine and repression, coupled with a thriving smuggling trade. Many republican detainees were held at the beach-side Ondarreta Prison in grim and humid conditions, until the building was demolished in 1948. However, industrial development paved the way for urban expansion in the Egia and Amara Berri districts, on the marshes and riverbed of the Urumea, at the end of the 1940s and beginning of the 1950s.

In 1943, the first Basque language schools were established by Elvira Zipitria, who taught in Basque from her home in the Old Town. In 1947, the Grand Casino was converted into the City Hall. In 1953, city businessmen organised the first San Sebastián International Film Festival to stimulate the economic life and profile of the city.

Mass immigration from other parts of Spain, spurred by growing industrial production, greatly increased the population, initiating rapid and chaotic urban development on the outskirts of the city (Altza, Intxaurrondo, Herrera, Bidebieta). Social, cultural and political conflicts followed, leading to popular dissatisfaction. Protests and street demonstrations became more common, driven by Basque nationalists (especially the armed separatist organisation ETA) and various underground unions, triggering the first state of emergency in Gipuzkoa in 1968. Several more were imposed by the Francoist authorities in the period immediately preceding Franco's death in 1975.

Amid the fragile economic situation and real estate speculation, the Kursaal and the Chofre bullring in Gros were demolished in 1973. From 1975 to 1977, sculptor Eduardo Chillida and architect Luis Peña Ganchegui's landmark The Comb of the Winds was built at the western tip of the bay. The 1970s to the mid-1980s were years of general urban and social decay marked by social and political unrest and violence.

In 1979, the first democratic municipal elections were held, won by the Basque Nationalist Party, who held office along with splinter party Eusko Alkartasuna (Basque Solidarity) until 1991. The Spanish Socialist Workers' Party's Odon Elorza took over as mayor from 1991 until 2011, when he was defeated unexpectedly by Juan Carlos Izagirre (Bildu) in elections.

From the 1990s, a major makeover of the city centre began, aimed at enhancing and revamping the neoclassical and modernist side of San Sebastián's architecture. Other regeneration projects included the reshaping and enlargement of Zurriola beach and promenade, the opening of the Kursaal Palace cubes (1999), the new university campus and technology facilities in Ibaeta, the creation of a wide network of cycle lanes, underground car-parks and significant improvements to public transport. Districts of cutting-edge design have been erected, such as Ibaeta and Riberas de Loiola, while some other major public works are still pending confirmation of funding and approval.

== Geography ==
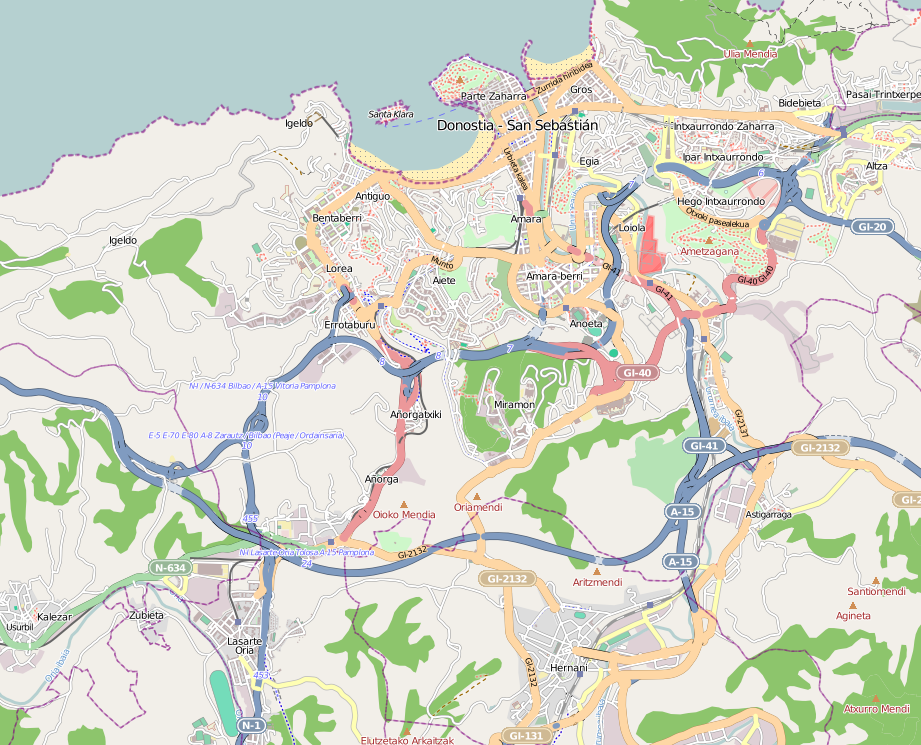
Map of San Sebastián

The city is located in the north of the Basque Country, on the south-eastern coast of the Bay of Biscay. San Sebastián has three beaches, Concha, Ondarreta, and Zurriola, and is surrounded by hilly areas: Urgull (adjacent to the old part of the city), Mount Ulia (extending east to Pasaia), Mount Adarra (south of the city) and Igeldo (overlooking Concha Bay from the west).

San Sebastián lies at the mouth of the Urumea river, and it was in large part built on the river's wetlands during the last two centuries. The city centre and the districts of Amara Berri and Riberas de Loiola lie on the former riverbed, which was diverted to its current canalized course in the first half of the 20th century.

=== Climate ===
San Sebastián features an oceanic climate (Köppen Cfb) with warm summers and cool winters. Like many cities with this climate, San Sebastián typically experiences cloudy or overcast conditions for the majority of the year, typically with some precipitation. The city averages roughly 1,650 mm (65 in) of precipitation annually, which is fairly evenly spread throughout the year. However, the city is somewhat drier and noticeably sunnier in the summer months, experiencing on average approximately 100 mm (3.94 in) of precipitation during those months. Average temperatures range from 8.9 °C (48.0 °F) in January to 21.5 °C (70.7 °F) in August.

Climate data for San Sebastián Airport Hondarribia, (15 km (9 miles) east of San Sebastián) (1991–2020, extremes since 1955)
Month	Jan	Feb	Mar	Apr	May	Jun	Jul	Aug	Sep	Oct	Nov	Dec	Year
Record high °C (°F)	24.6 (76.3)	28.6 (83.5)	29.0 (84.2)	32.4 (90.3)	36.6 (97.9)	43.5 (110.3)	42.2 (108.0)	41.7 (107.1)	38.0 (100.4)	33.4 (92.1)	29.4 (84.9)	26.0 (78.8)	43.5 (110.3)
Mean daily maximum °C (°F)	13.2 (55.8)	13.8 (56.8)	16.2 (61.2)	17.8 (64.0)	20.8 (69.4)	23.2 (73.8)	25.1 (77.2)	25.9 (78.6)	23.9 (75.0)	20.9 (69.6)	16.2 (61.2)	13.8 (56.8)	19.3 (66.7)
Daily mean °C (°F)	9.3 (48.7)	9.6 (49.3)	11.9 (53.4)	13.6 (56.5)	16.5 (61.7)	19.3 (66.7)	21.3 (70.3)	21.8 (71.2)	19.6 (67.3)	16.7 (62.1)	12.3 (54.1)	10.0 (50.0)	15.2 (59.4)
Mean daily minimum °C (°F)	5.4 (41.7)	5.4 (41.7)	7.6 (45.7)	9.3 (48.7)	12.3 (54.1)	15.4 (59.7)	17.5 (63.5)	17.8 (64.0)	15.2 (59.4)	12.4 (54.3)	8.4 (47.1)	6.2 (43.2)	11.1 (52.0)
Record low °C (°F)	−12.0 (10.4)	−13.0 (8.6)	−5.2 (22.6)	−1.2 (29.8)	3.0 (37.4)	5.3 (41.5)	7.8 (46.0)	8.4 (47.1)	4.6 (40.3)	0.8 (33.4)	−5.8 (21.6)	−8.4 (16.9)	−13.0 (8.6)
Average precipitation mm (inches)	172.6 (6.80)	141.2 (5.56)	132.8 (5.23)	142.6 (5.61)	126.0 (4.96)	105.6 (4.16)	91.7 (3.61)	112.9 (4.44)	143.4 (5.65)	173.9 (6.85)	227.0 (8.94)	177.7 (7.00)	1,747.4 (68.81)
Average precipitation days (≥ 1 mm)	13.7	11.9	12.4	13.4	12.3	10.4	9.9	10.0	10.7	11.8	14.0	12.8	143.3
Mean monthly sunshine hours	87	109	146	164	190	190	204	207	178	138	91	80	1,784
Source: Météo Climat

Climate data for San Sebastián Airport Hondarribia, (15 km (9 miles) east of San Sebastián) (1981–2010 normals)
Month	Jan	Feb	Mar	Apr	May	Jun	Jul	Aug	Sep	Oct	Nov	Dec	Year
Mean daily maximum °C (°F)	13.1 (55.6)	13.8 (56.8)	16.1 (61.0)	17.5 (63.5)	20.7 (69.3)	23.1 (73.6)	25.1 (77.2)	25.7 (78.3)	24.0 (75.2)	21.0 (69.8)	16.2 (61.2)	13.5 (56.3)	19.2 (66.6)
Daily mean °C (°F)	8.9 (48.0)	9.4 (48.9)	11.6 (52.9)	13.0 (55.4)	16.2 (61.2)	19.0 (66.2)	21.0 (69.8)	21.5 (70.7)	19.4 (66.9)	16.4 (61.5)	12.0 (53.6)	9.6 (49.3)	14.8 (58.6)
Mean daily minimum °C (°F)	4.7 (40.5)	5.0 (41.0)	7.0 (44.6)	8.5 (47.3)	11.8 (53.2)	14.8 (58.6)	16.9 (62.4)	17.2 (63.0)	14.7 (58.5)	11.8 (53.2)	7.8 (46.0)	5.6 (42.1)	10.5 (50.9)
Average precipitation mm (inches)	157 (6.2)	135 (5.3)	124 (4.9)	156 (6.1)	120 (4.7)	95 (3.7)	85 (3.3)	117 (4.6)	132 (5.2)	167 (6.6)	188 (7.4)	174 (6.9)	1,649 (64.9)
Average precipitation days (≥ 1 mm)	13	12	12	14	12	10	9	10	10	12	13	12	138
Average snowy days	1	1	0	0	0	0	0	0	0	0	0	0	2
Average relative humidity (%)	75	72	70	71	72	73	74	75	75	75	76	75	74
Mean monthly sunshine hours	88	108	141	159	182	188	198	197	170	134	96	81	1,750
Source: Agencia Estatal de Meteorología

== Demographics ==
Historical population
Year	Pop.	±%
1842	10,801	—
1857	15,911	+47.3%
1877	22,919	+44.0%
1887	31,819	+38.8%
1900	39,641	+24.6%
1910	47,353	+19.5%
1920	67,311	+42.1%
1930	78,484	+16.6%
1940	93,499	+19.1%
1950	110,687	+18.4%
1960	131,637	+18.9%
1970	161,293	+22.5%
1981	172,303	+6.8%
1991	171,439	−0.5%
2001	178,377	+4.0%
2011	185,512	+4.0%
2021	187,892	+1.3%
Source: INE (Note: Including the now-annexed municipalities of Zubieta, Igueldo, and Alza, but excluding Astigarraga, which was part of San Sebastián between the 1950 and 1981 censuses.)

As of 2024, the population of San Sebastián is 188,487, of whom 47.3% are male and 52.7% are female, compared to the nationwide average of 49.0% and 51.0% respectively. People under 16 years old make up 12.2% of the population, and people over 65 years old make up 25.8%, compared to the nationwide average of 14.3% and 20.4% respectively.

As of 2024, the foreign-born population is 27,342, equal to 14.5% of the total population. The 5 largest foreign nationalities are Hondurans (3,103), Colombians (2,753), Nicaraguans (2,504), Moroccans (1,553) and Argentinians (1,402).

Foreign population by country of birth (2024)
Country	Population
Honduras	3,103
Colombia	2,753
Nicaragua	2,504
Morocco	1,553
Argentina	1,402
Ecuador	1,346
Venezuela	1,033
France	955
Ukraine	781
Peru	772
Brazil	637
China	592
Dominican Republic	582
Mexico	559
Cuba	554

== Districts ==
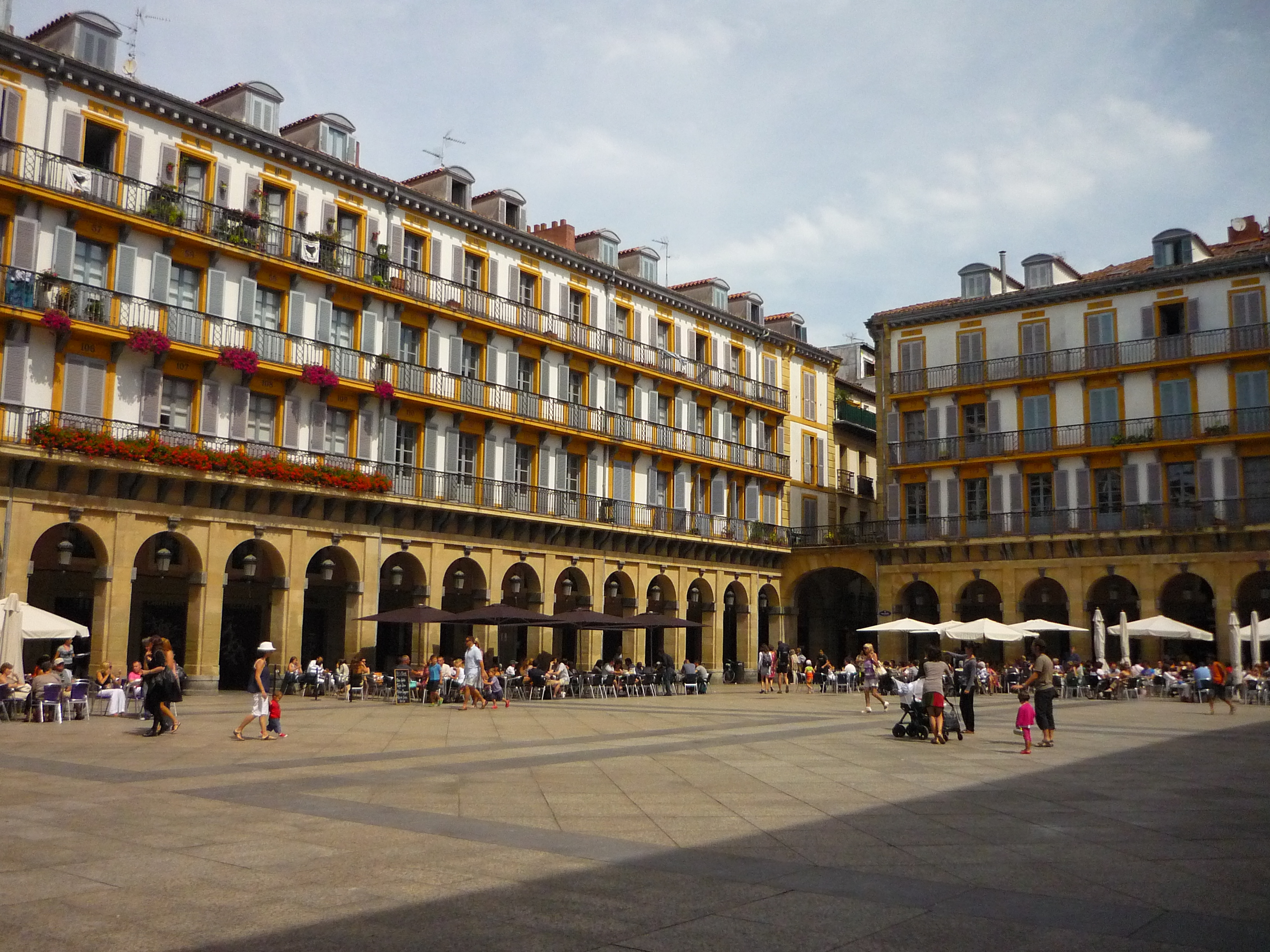
Façade of the Constitution Square (Plaza) in San Sebastián

New districts developed after the walls of the city were demolished in 1863, as the city expanded in several directions, first into the flatlands shaped by the river Urumea and later up the hills. The first expansion of the old town was towards the river's mouth, on the old quarter called Zurriola (a name later given by Council decision to the sand area and the avenue across the river).

The orthogonal layout of the modern city centre (the Cortazar development) was built up until 1914 (when the first phase finished) reflecting a Parisian Haussmannian style. The arcades of the Buen Pastor square were modelled upon those of the Rue de Rivoli, while the Maria Cristina Bridge was inspired by the Pont Alexandre III that crosses the Seine. The Estación del Norte train station standing directly across the bridge was inaugurated in 1864, just after the arrival of the railway to San Sebastián. Its metallic roof was designed by Gustave Eiffel. San Sebastián's central bus station is located underground adjacent to the train station.

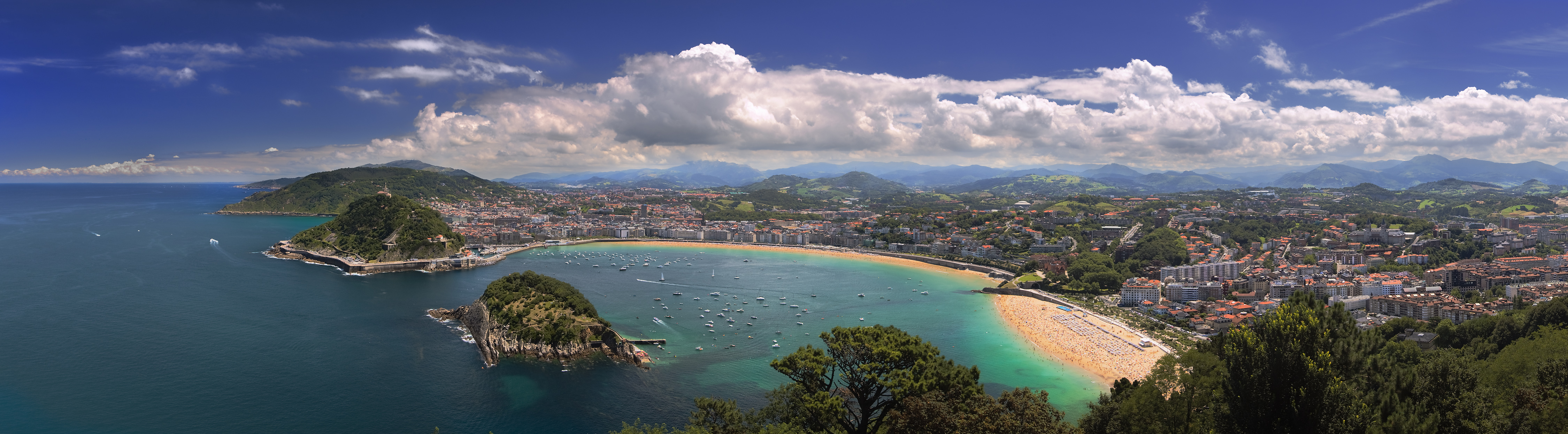
Panoramic view of the La Concha Bay in the daytime
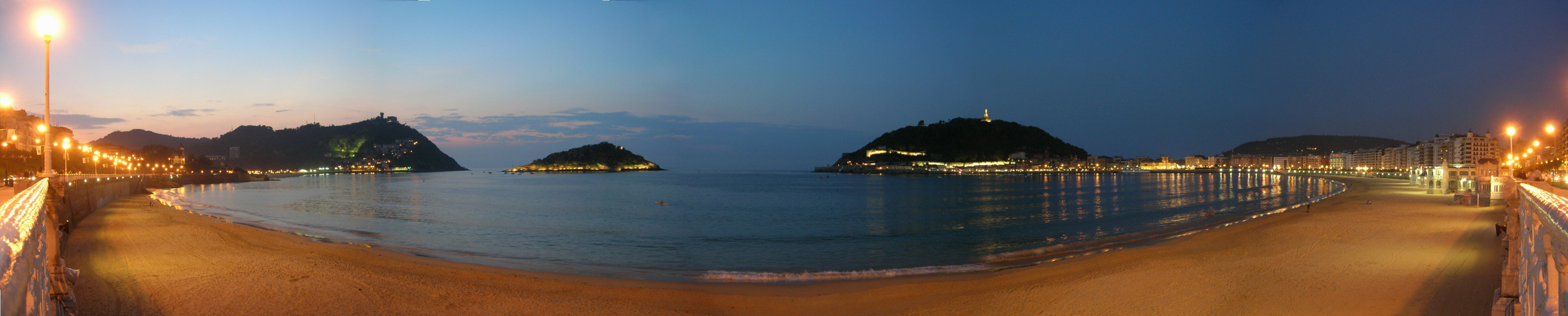
Panoramic view of La Concha Bay at night

=== Parte Vieja / Alde Zaharra ===
The Parte Vieja (Spanish) or Alde Zaharra (Basque) — Old Town – is the traditional core area of the city, and was surrounded by walls until 1863, when they were demolished in order to occupy the stretch of sand and land that connected the town to the mainland. A part of these walls is still standing at the exit from the Old Town towards the port, through the Portaletas gate. The Old Town is divided into two parishes relating to the Santa Maria and San Vicente churches; the inhabitants belonging to the former are known traditionally as joxemaritarrak, while those attached to the latter are referred to as koxkeroak. Until the early 18th century, the koxkeroak mostly spoke Gascon. Especially after the end of the Franco dictatorship, many bars were established around the Old Part. Most current buildings date back to the 19th century, built as part of the city's reconstruction after the 1813 destruction of the town by the allied Anglo-Portuguese troops.

There is a small fishing and recreation port, with two-floor houses lined under the front-wall of mount Urgull. These houses are relatively new, resulting from the demilitarization of the hill, sold to the city council by the Ministry of War in 1924.

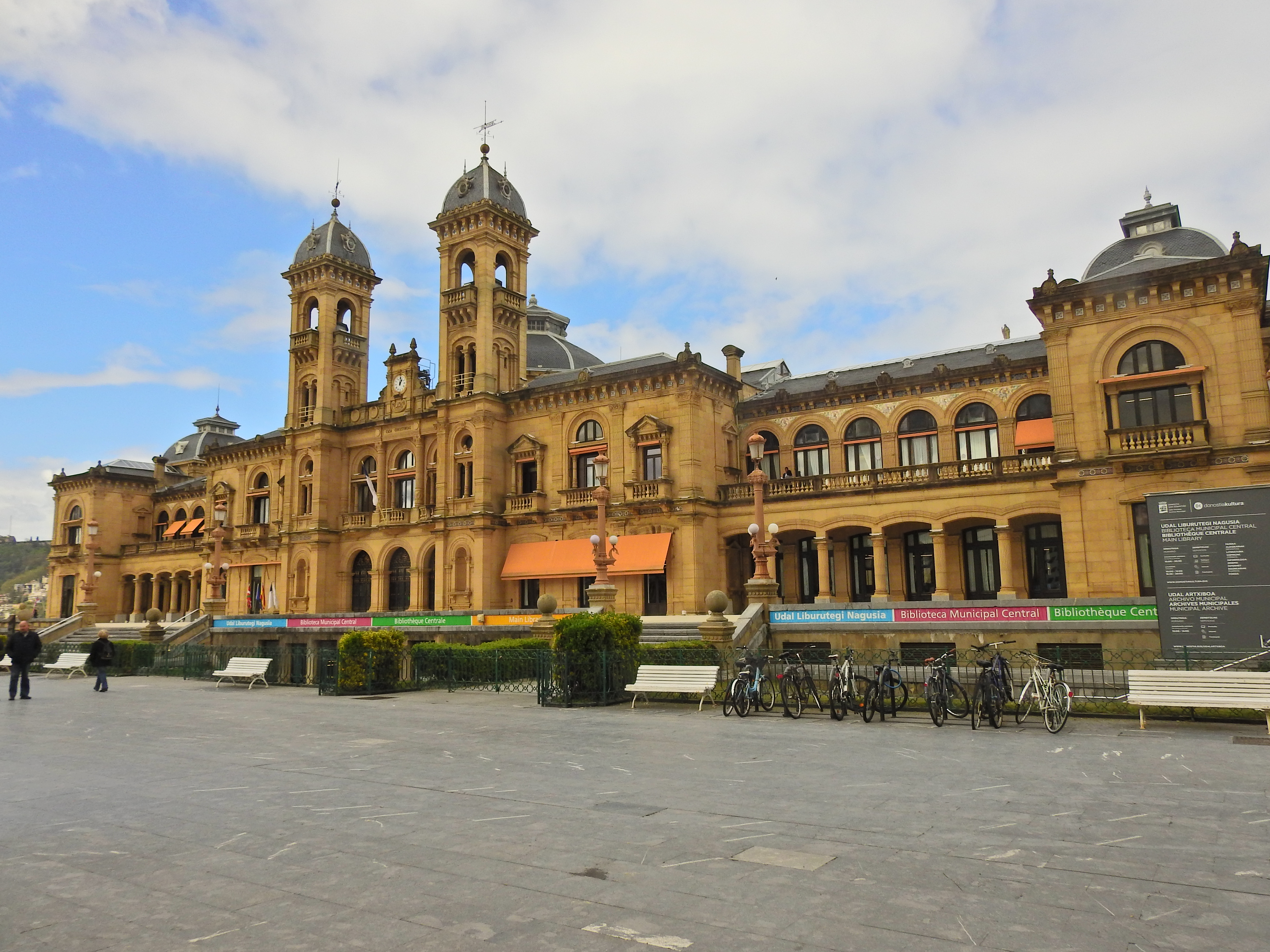
City hall of San Sebastián

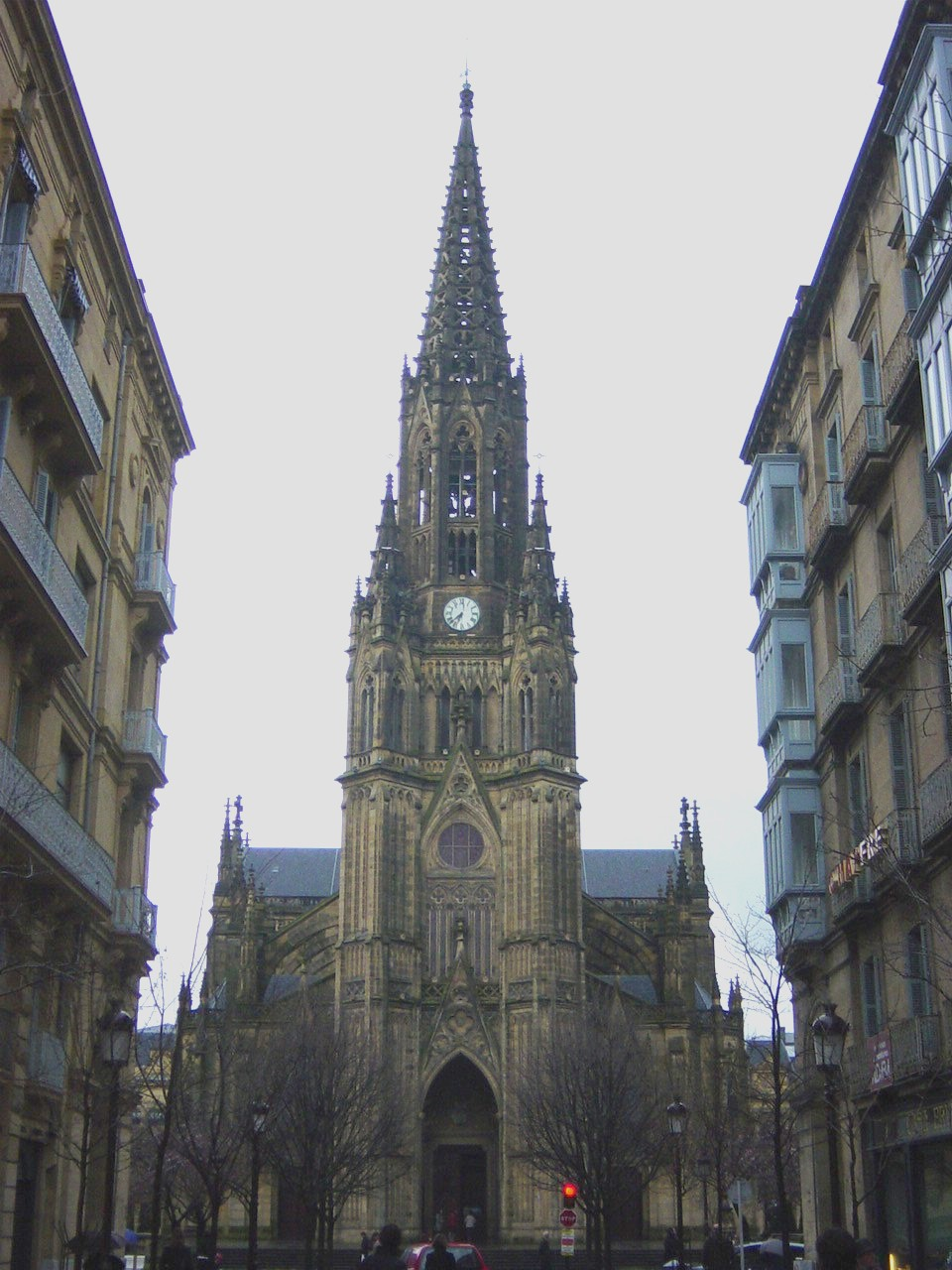
San Sebastián's Cathedral

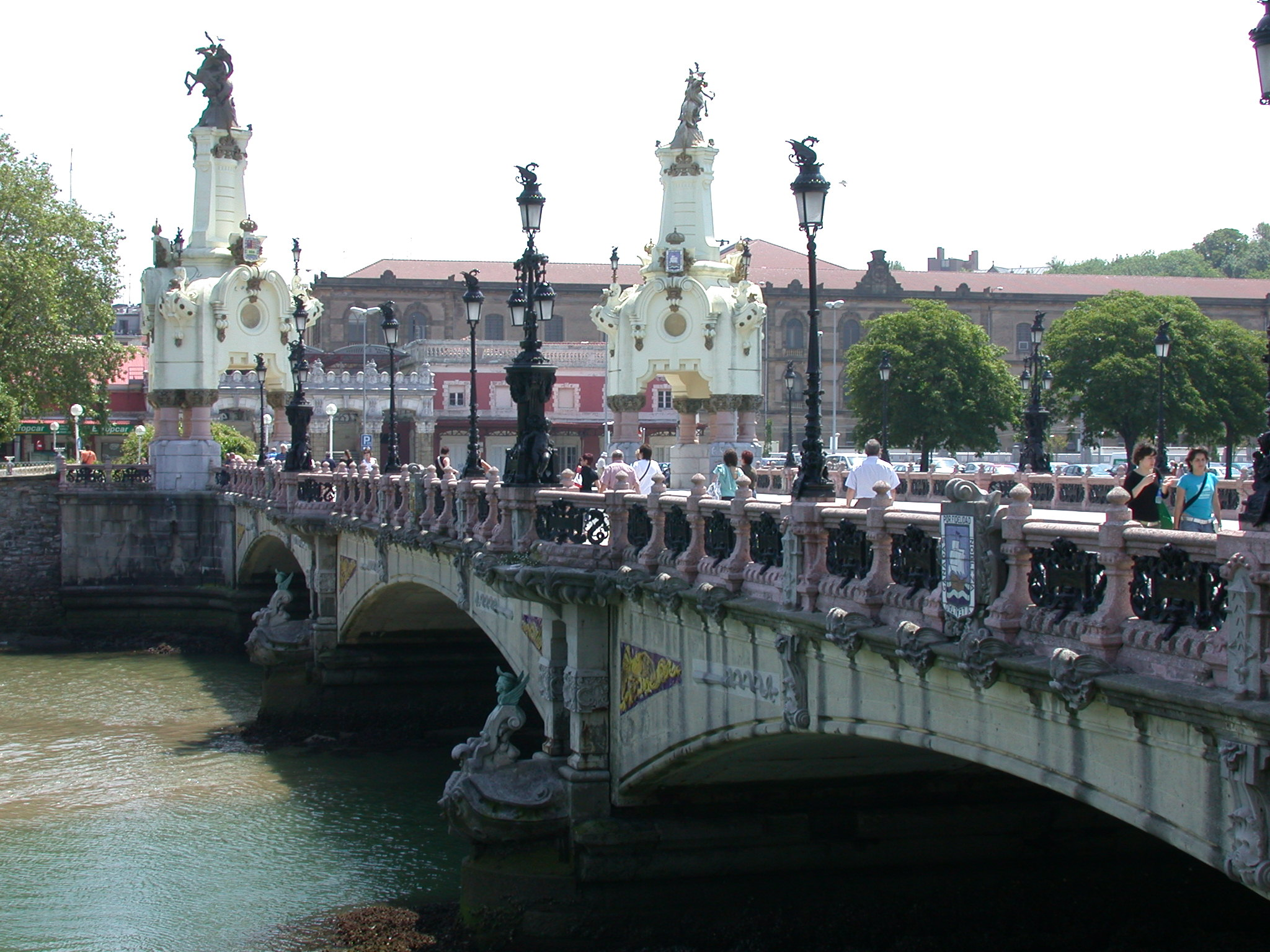
María Cristina Bridge

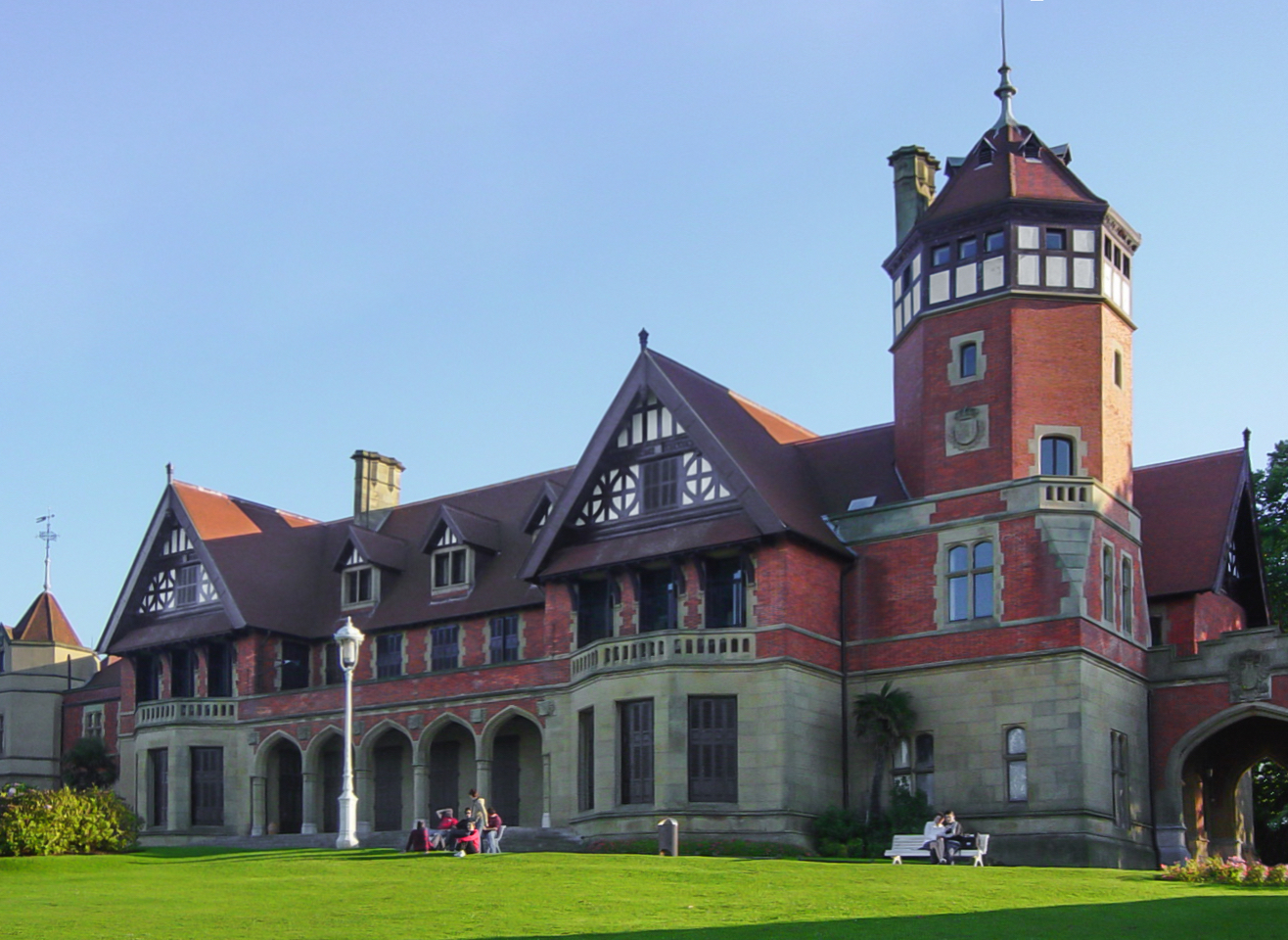
Miramar Palace

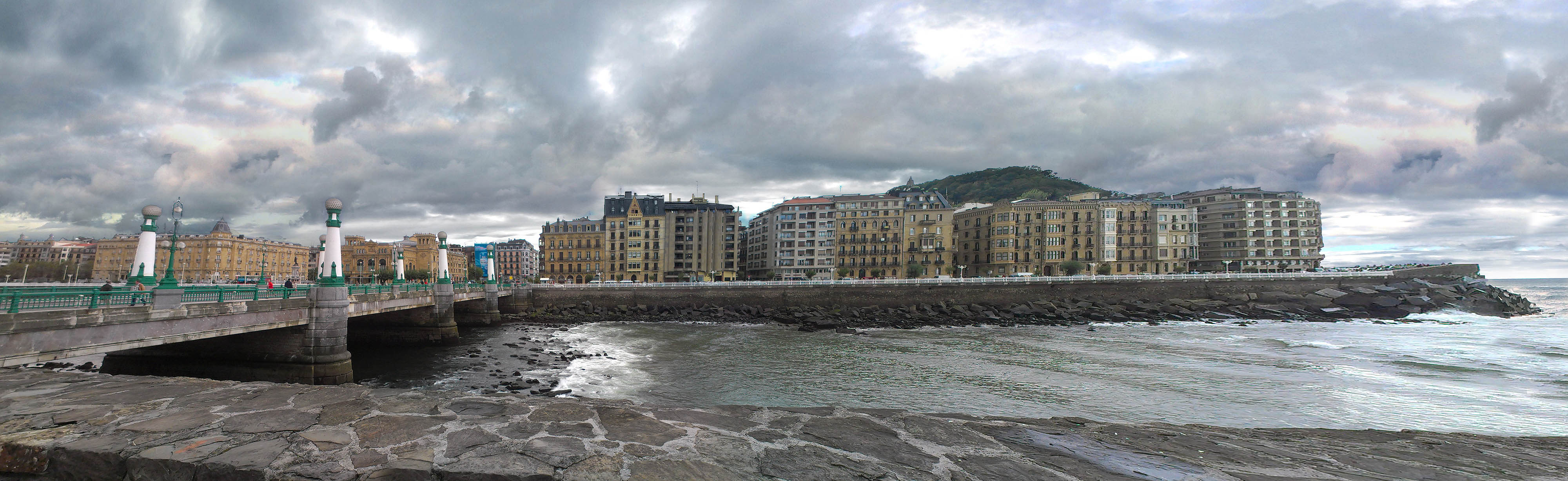
Zurriola Bridge and mouth of the Urumea

=== Antiguo ===
This part is located on the western side of the city beyond the Miramar Palace. The monastery of San Sebastián el Antiguo ('the Old') is mentioned in historical documents from the time of the foundation of the city in the 12th century. In the mid 19th century, industrial enterprises developed in the district, such as Cervezas El León, Suchard, and Lizarriturry, and it subsequently came to be populated by workers. Industry has since been replaced by services and the tourism sector. The Matia kalea provides the main axis for the district.

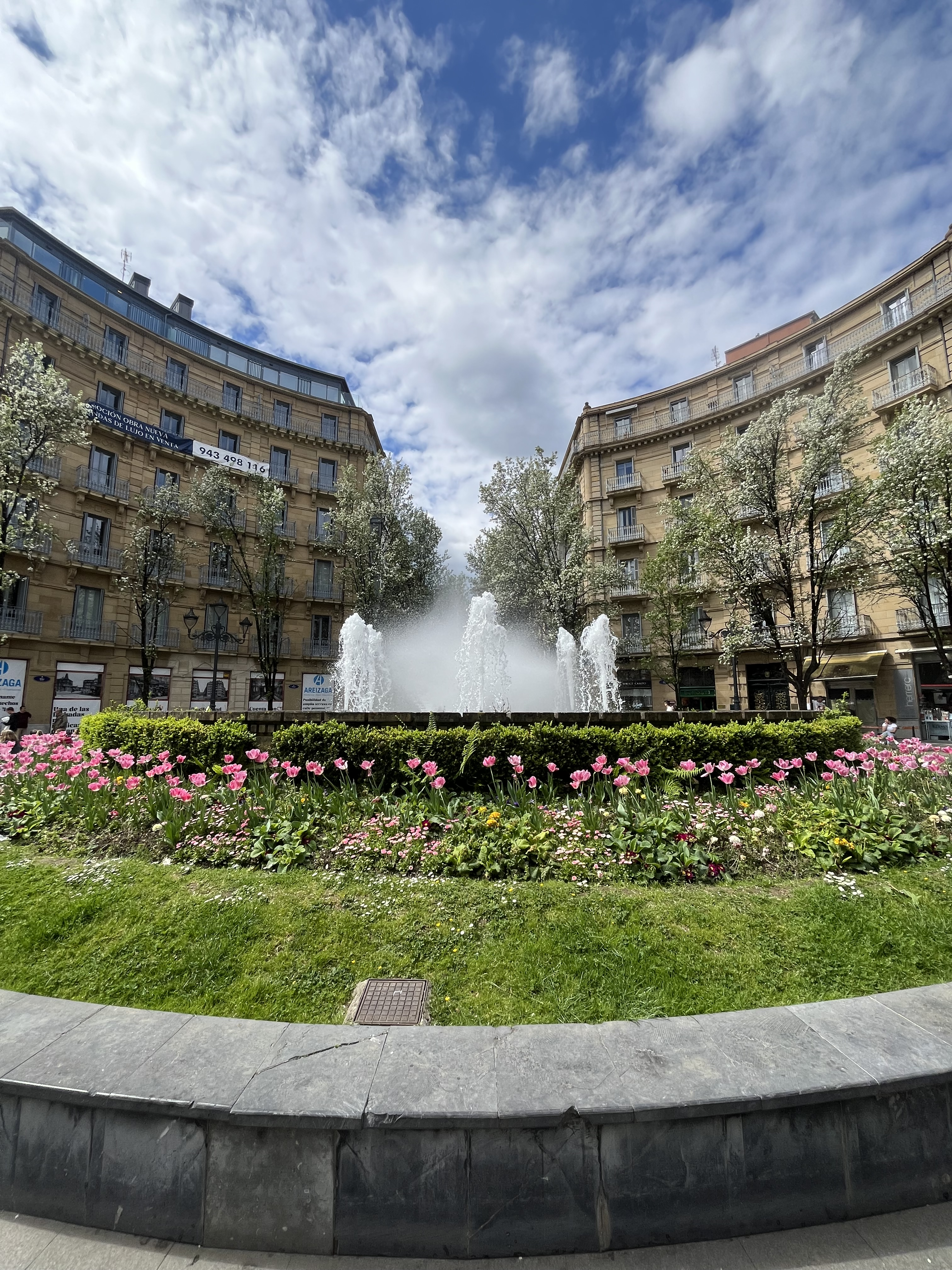
Bilbao Square Fountain in Amara

=== Amara Zaharra ===
Amara Zaharra ("Old Amara") is named after the Amara farmhouse. Over time it has mostly merged with the city centre, as the former Amara lay on the marshes on the left of the River Urumea. The core of this district is the Easo plaza, with the Euskotren railway terminal closing the square at its south.

=== Amara Berri ===
This southern expansion of the city began from the 1940s, after the completion of works to canalize the river. Nowadays the name Amara usually refers to this district, which has exceeded Amara Zaharra both in size and population. The district revolves around the axis of Avenida Sancho el Sabio and Avenida de Madrid, and is the main road entrance to the city. Facilities of many state run agencies are established here, as well as many business offices.

=== Gros ===
The district is built on the sandy terrain across the river from the old town. In the 19th century, shanties and workshops began to appear in this area, which was eventually named for Tomás Gros, one of the main proprietors. The former monumental bullring in the area, Chofre, was demolished in 1973, and the site is now occupied by a housing estate. A relatively recent major landmark of the district is the Kursaal Congress Centre overlooking Zurriola Beach.

=== Aiete ===
One of the newest parts of the city, Aiete retained a rural character until not long ago. The post-war city council purchased the compound of the Aiete Palace for the use of Francisco Franco in 1940, immediately after the Civil War. The palace became Franco's summer residence until 1975, and is now home to the Bakearen Etxea (Peace Memorial House).

=== Egia ===
Egia, stemming from (H)Egia (Basque for either bank/shore or hill), is a district of San Sebastián on the right side of the Urumea beyond the train station. At the beginning of the 20th century, a patch of land by the railway started to be used as a football pitch, eventually turning into the official stadium of the local team Real Sociedad before it was transferred in the 1990s to Anoeta, south of Amara Berri (nowadays the site harbours houses). The former tobacco factory building Tabakalera, which has been converted into a Contemporary Culture Centre, conjures up the former industrial past of the area. Right opposite to this building lies the Cristina Enea park, a public compound with a botanic vocation. Egia holds the city cemetery, Polloe, at the north-east fringes of the district, stretching out to South Intxaurrondo.

=== Intxaurrondo ===
This part (meaning 'walnut tree' in Basque) is a large district to the east of the city. The original nucleus lies between the railway and the Ategorrieta Avenue, where still today the farmhouse Intxaurrondo Zar, declared "National Monument", is situated since the mid-17th century. The railway cuts across the district, the southern side being the fruit of the heavy development undergone in the area during the immigration years of the 1950s and 1960s. In addition, further housing estates have been built up more recently souther beyond the N-1 E-5 E-80 E-70 ring road (South Intxaurrondo). The police force Guardia Civil runs controversial barracks there (works for new housing are underway).

=== Altza ===
Altza (Basque for alder tree) is the easternmost district of San Sebastián, along with Bidebieta and Trintxerpe. In 1910 it was a quaint village comprising scattered farmhouses and a small nucleus, with 2,683 inhabitants, but the arrival of thousands of immigrants in the 1960s and 1970s led to rapid and chaotic housing and building activity, resulting in a maze of grey landscape of skyscrapers with a population of 32,531 in 1970. The population is 20,000 as of 2013.

=== Ibaeta ===
Ibaeta stands on the former location for various factories (e.g., Cervezas El León) of San Sebastián, with the buildings of the old industrial estate being demolished in the late 20th century. The levelling of this large flat area paved the ground for a carefully planned modern and elegant housing estate, featuring a new university campus for the public University of the Basque Country (UPV-EHU) and institutions such as the Donostia International Physics Center or the Nanotechnology Center. A stream called Konporta flows down along the eastern side of the area, but it was canalized under the ground almost all along to its mouth on the bay pushed by urban building pressure.

=== Loiola ===
It lies by the Urumea at the south-east end of the city. It comprises a small patch of detached houses (Ciudad Jardín) and a core area of 6-odd floor buildings. The district has recently gone through a major makeover, with works finishing in 2008. The road axis coming from important industrial areas (Astigarraga-Hernani) crosses the district heading downtown. A military base stands across the river, home to an uprising in 1936. Attempts by the city council to close it have been unsuccessful so far.

=== Riberas de Loiola ===
New modern district erected in the 2000s next to the city's inner bypass and south road entrance to San Sebastián. A pedestrian bridge spans the Urumea river onto the Cristina Enea Park.

=== Martutene ===
The Martutene district bordering to the south on the town of Astigarraga comes next to Loiola in the south direction. This part of the city features an industrial area, a football pitch for lower leagues, a disused vocational training building and enclosure as well as a prison, much in decay and due to be transferred soon to a new location, probably in the municipality's exclave of Zubieta, while this option is coming in for much opposition.

=== Ulia ===
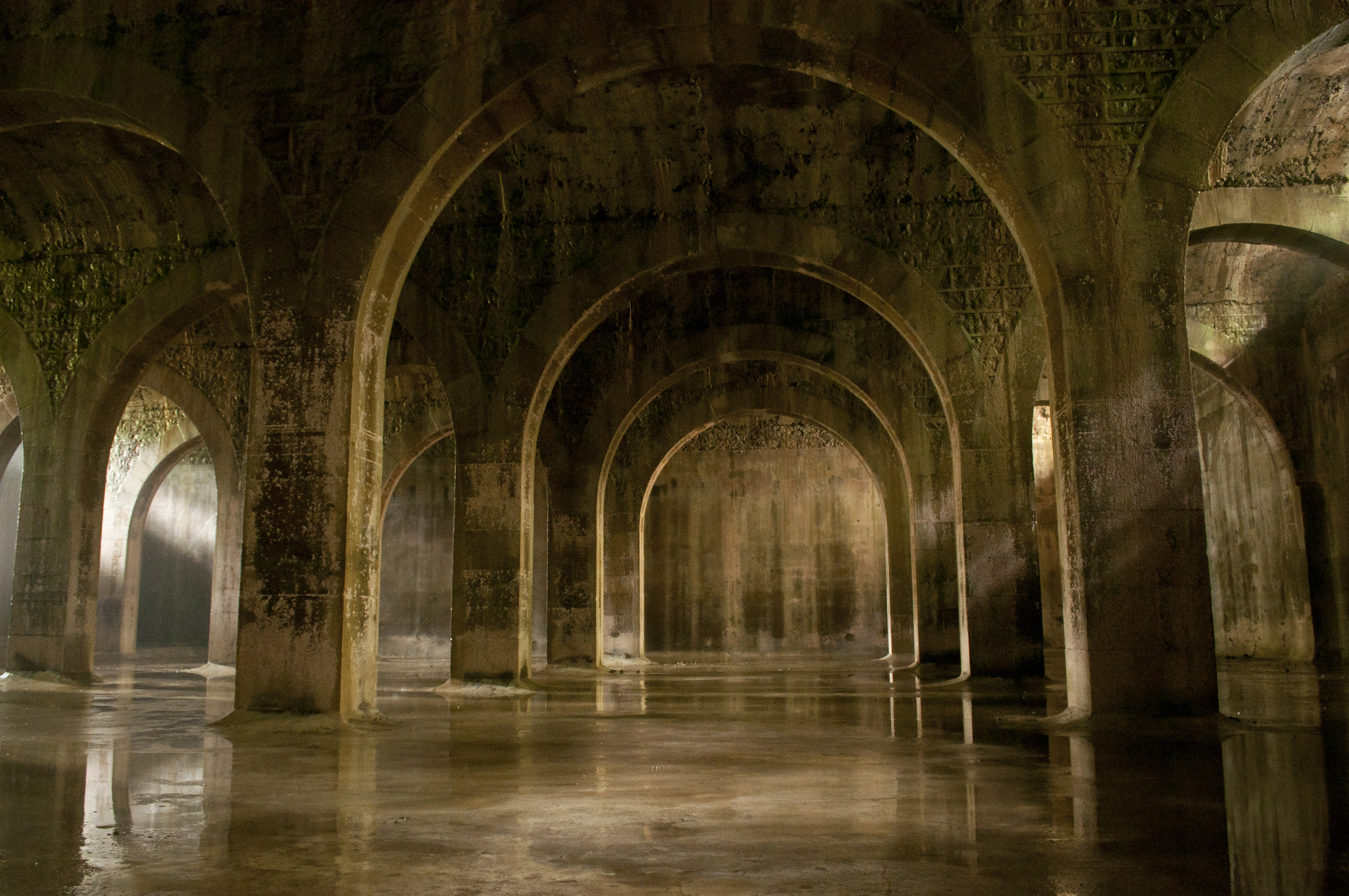
Former tank supplying the city with sanitary water in Ulia

This part stands on the east side of the city at the foot of the Mount Ulia Park, on the left hand side of the road heading from San Sebastián to Pasaia and Irun. It consists of a residential area, besides holding a number of educational institutions, culture and sports centres built since 1980. The Park of Nurseries of Ulia sits at the base of the road leading to Mount Ulia, with its name deriving from its function as a nursery of plants for the public gardens of San Sebastián throughout the 20th century until 2008. It includes two ancient water-tanks, architectonic elements, and specific flora and fauna.

=== Añorga ===
Former area of baserris or farmsteads on the outskirts of San Sebastián, the establishment in 1900 of the Cementos Rezola company in the neighborhood transformed Añorga into an industrial-type neighborhood, although it will lose its rural character that it once had. Even considering Añorga a single neighborhood, three distinct neighborhoods are generally distinguished: Añorga (Añorga Haundi), Añorga-Txiki and Rekalde. According to the National Institute of Statistics, it had 1769 inhabitants in 2013.

=== Zubieta ===
The exclave Zubieta (meaning 'place of bridges') was a village until recent years, with a number of houses, a pelota pitch (with a single wall as opposed to the regular two) and a church. However, it has since undergone much urban development, and is now a built-up area with paved streets and due equipment. There are two contested proposals for a new solid-waste incinerator and a prison in the area. In the wake of the 1813 burning, inhabitants of San Sebastián held a meeting at a house in the village to decide the reconstruction of the town.

== Culture ==
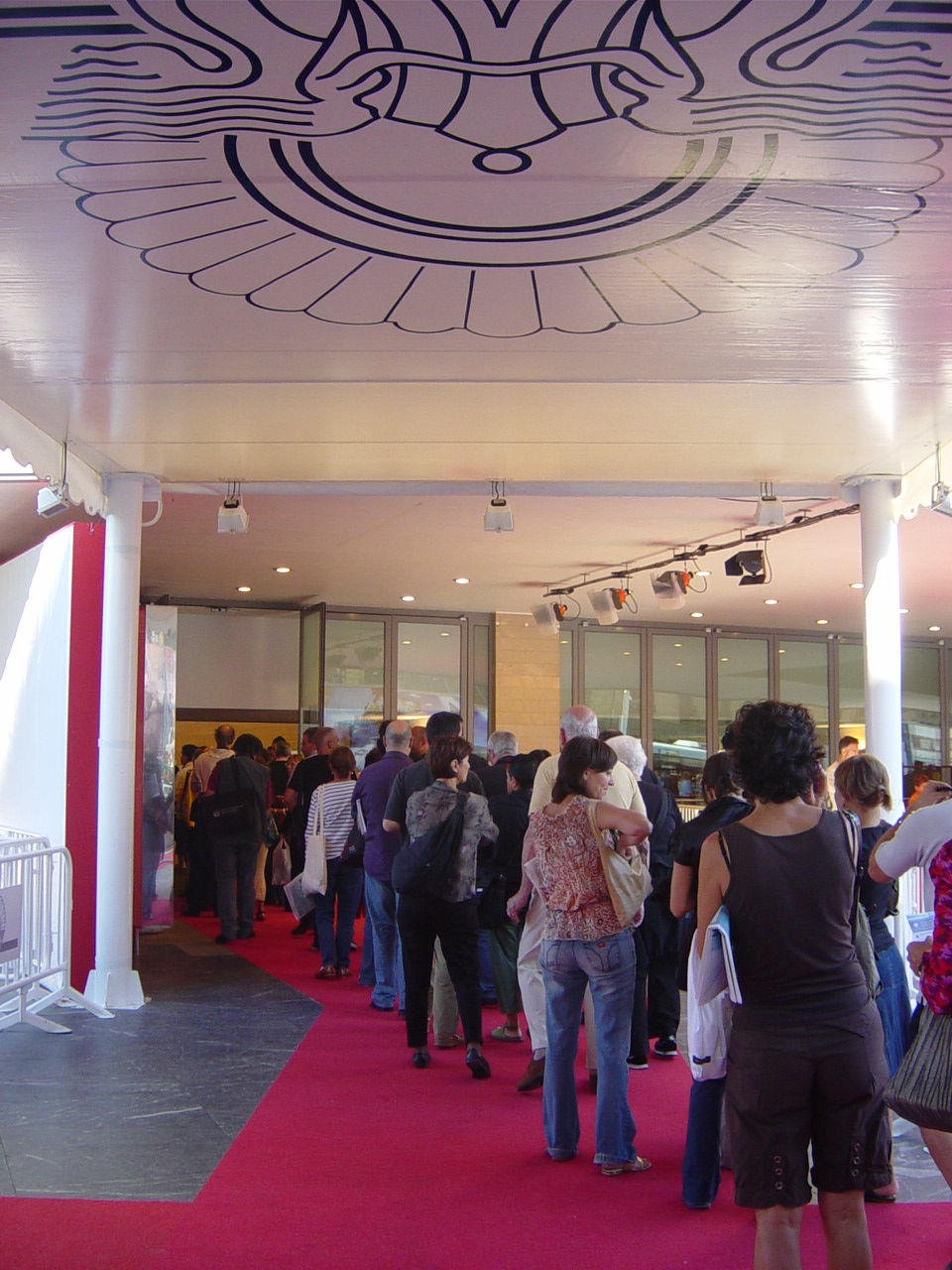
San Sebastián International Film Festival, Red Carpet

San Sebastián has a dynamic cultural scene, and was selected as European Capital of Culture for 2016 (shared with Wrocław, Poland) with the motto, "Waves of people's energy".

Cultural events including traditional city festivals, music, theatre, and cinema take place throughout the year, especially in summer. In the last week of July, the city hosts the San Sebastian Jazz Festival (Jazzaldia), the longest continuously running Jazz Festival in Europe, featuring concerts staged in different locations around the city, sometimes with free admission. This is followed by the Musical Fortnight, which features classical music concerts taking place over 15 days into August. The San Sebastián International Film Festival is held in September, for more than 50 years, centred around the Kursaal Palace and the Victoria Eugenia Theatre. The city is also home to the San Telmo Museoa, a major cultural institution with an ethnographic, artistic and civic vocation.

Other cinema festivals in the city include: Street Zinema, an international audiovisual festival exploring contemporary art and urban culture; the Horror and Fantasy Festival in October; and the Surfilm Festival, a cinema festival featuring surfing footage, especially shorts.

=== San Sebastián Day ===
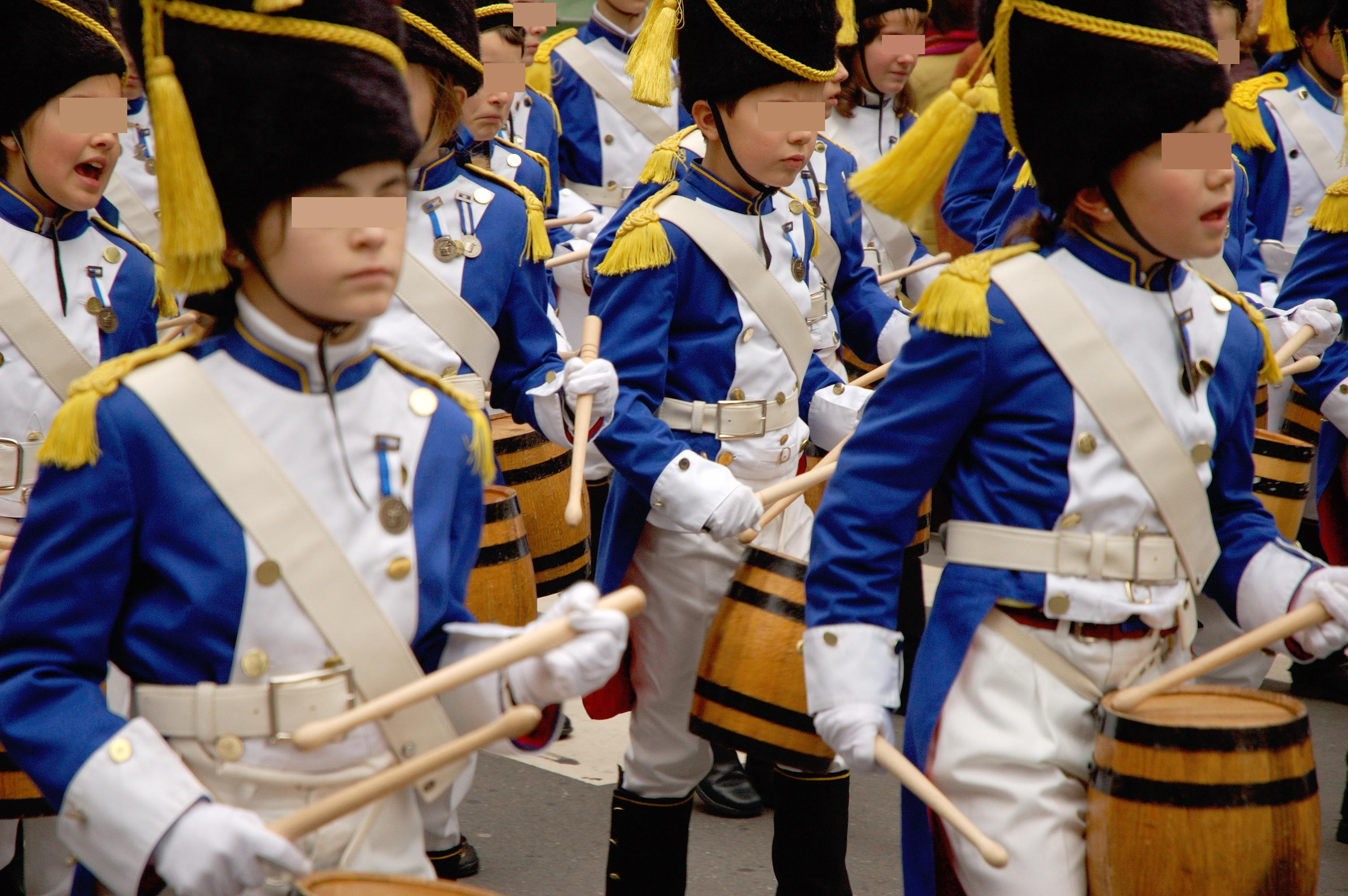
Tamborrada, children's section

Every year on 20 January, the feast of Saint Sebastian, the people of San Sebastián celebrate a festival known as the "Tamborrada", the most celebrated festival of the year for residents of the town. At midnight, in the Konstituzio plaza in the "Alde Zaharra/Parte Vieja" (Old Part), the mayor raises the flag of San Sebastián. For 24 hours, the entire city is filled with the sound of drums. The adults march around the city dressed as chefs and soldiers throughout the night as part of the March of San Sebastián.

On this day in the early 19th century, a procession was held from the Santa Maria Church in the Old Part to the San Sebastián Church in the district of Antiguo, while later limited due to weather conditions to the walled area. The event finished with a public dance accompanied by the military band's flutes and drums. Every day, a soldiers' parade took place to change the guards at the town's southern walls. Since the San Sebastián Day was the first festival heralding the upcoming Carnival, exuberant youths began to follow them, aping their martial manners and drumrolls, using the buckets left at the fountains as drums. The celebrations started to take their current form in the period from the 1860s to 1880s, with real military style outfits and parades and music by composer Raimundo Sarriegui.

Adults usually have dinner in txokos ("gourmet clubs"). Traditionally, these admitted only men, but now even the most conservative ones allow women on the "Noche de la Tamborrada". They eat sophisticated meals cooked by themselves, mostly composed of seafood (traditionally elvers, now no longer served due to its exorbitant price) and drink the best wines.

=== La Semana Grande/Aste Nagusia ===
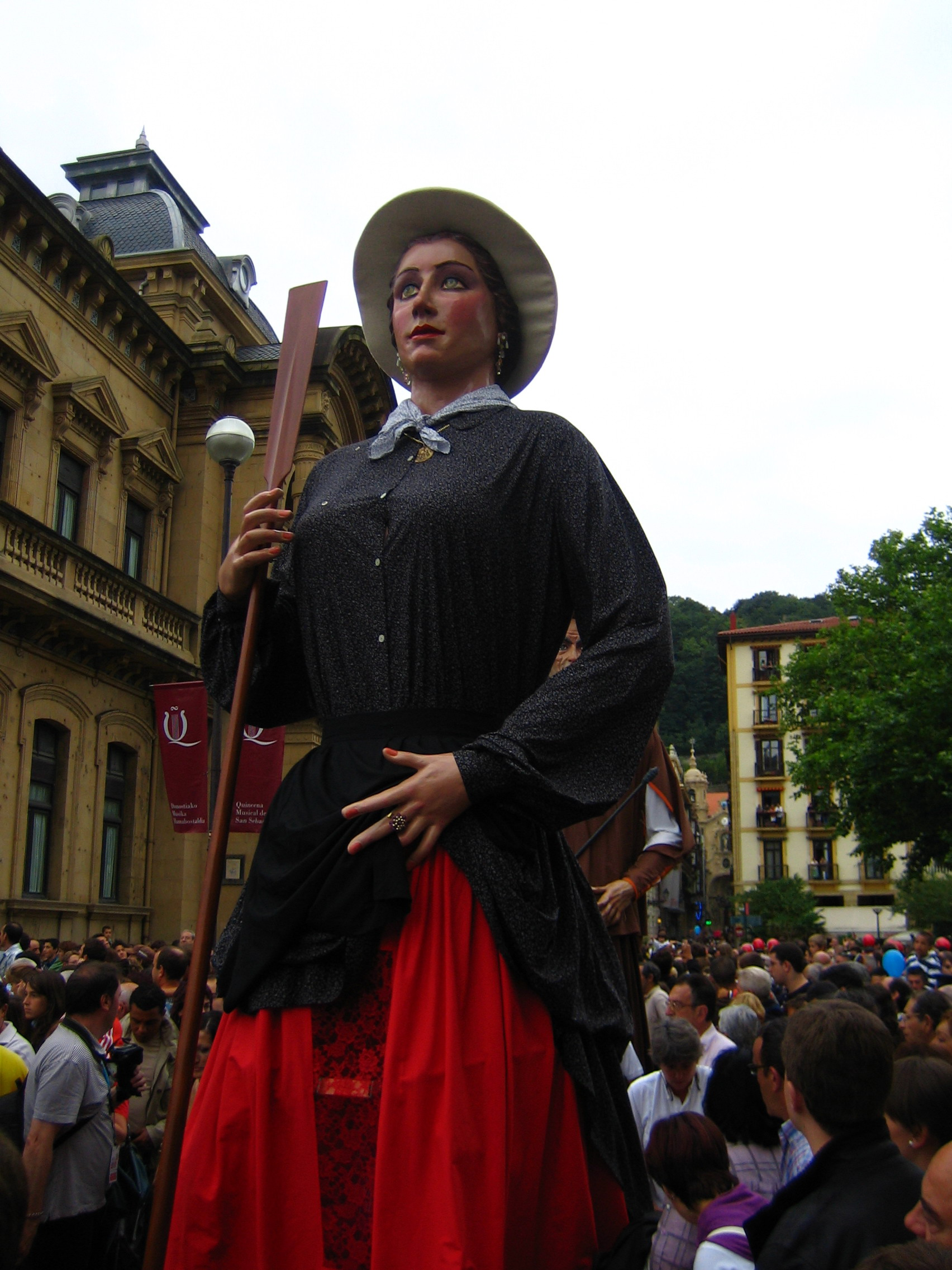
The city giants and big-heads in the Semana Grande/Aste Nagusia

A festival, La Semana Grande in Spanish and Aste Nagusia in Basque ("The Big/Main Week"), is held every year in mid-August. A major international fireworks competition is held during the festival, in which teams representing various countries and cities put on a fireworks display each night over the bay, with the winner of the contest announced at the end. The displays are sometimes accompanied by a full live orchestra performing on the boardwalk. Attendees often claim spots along the beach and bay hours in advance. The festival also includes a parade of marching bands, entertainers on stilts, and Basque processional giants every afternoon. Semana Grande attracts a lot of domestic and international tourism.

=== Basque Week ===
Running for several decades at the beginning of September, Basque Week features events related to Basque culture, such as performances of traditional improvising poets (bertsolaris), Basque pelota games, stone lifting contests, oxen wagers, dance exhibitions, and a cider tasting festival. The centrepiece of the festival is the rowing boat competition, in which teams from different towns around the Bay of Biscay compete for the Flag of La Concha. Thousands of supporters from these coastal locations fill the city's streets and promenades overlooking the bay to follow the event, especially on the Sunday of the final race.

=== Santa Ageda Bezpera ===
Saint Agatha's Eve is a traditional event taking place at the beginning of February or end of January in many places around the Basque Country, and is part of the run-up to the city's carnival. Groups dressed up in Basque traditional farmer costumes march across the neighbourhood singing and wielding a characteristic stick beaten on the ground to the rhythm of the traditional tune of Saint Agatha. The singers ask for a small donation, which can be money, a drink or something to eat.

=== Caldereros ===
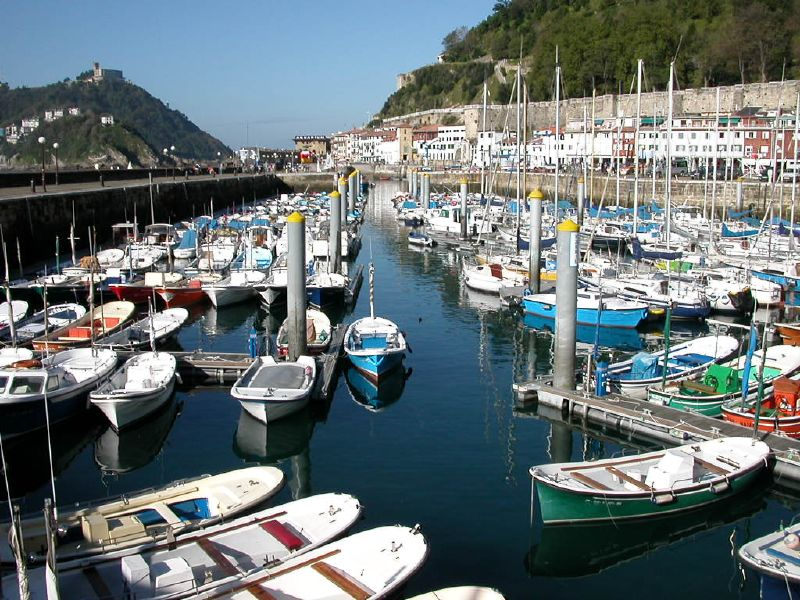
View of the harbour

This is a local festival held on the first Saturday of February linked to the upcoming Carnival, where different groups of people dressed in Romani tinkers attire take to the streets banging rhythmically a hammer or spoon against a pot or pan, and usually bar-hop while they sing the traditional songs for the occasion. They were just male voices some time ago, but women participate and sing currently too, and the main event is at the City Hall, where the city band plays marches while the crowds bang the pots and pans. The festival began in 1884.

=== Santo Tomas ===
The Santo Tomas festival takes place on Thomas the Apostle's day, 21 December. From the early morning, stalls are erected around the city centre, and visitors from across Gipuzkoa come to the centre and the Old Part, many dressed in traditional Basque "farmer" outfits. Traditional and typical produce is sold from the stalls; the main drink is cider and the most popular snacks are txistorra, a thin, uncured chorizo wrapped in talo flatbread. A large pig is displayed in Plaza Constitucion, which is raffled off during the festival.

=== Olentzero ===
As in other Basque cities, towns and villages, on Christmas Eve the Olentzero and the accompanying carol singers usually dressed in Basque farmer costume take over the streets, especially in the city centre, asking for small donations in bars, shops and banks after singing their repertoire. Sometimes Olentzero choirs roam around the streets in later dates, on the 31st for example, and are often related to cultural, social or political associations and demands.

== Economy ==
The main economic activities are commerce and tourism. San Sebastián is one of the best-known tourist destinations in Spain.

== Transport ==
The city is served by Euskotren Trena, Euskotren's railway network. Euskotren runs trains to Bilbao and other destinations, as well as the San Sebastián Metro; which together with Renfe's Cercanías San Sebastián cover the San Sebastián metropolitan area. There are frequent trains via San Sebastián railway station from Madrid to Hendaye in France, which is connected to the French rail network. The city is also served by San Sebastián Airport in the nearby municipality of Hondarribia. Bilbao airport is 98 km (61 mi) away from San Sebastián city. Biarritz Airport in France is located about 50 km (31 mi) from San Sebastián.

== Cuisine ==
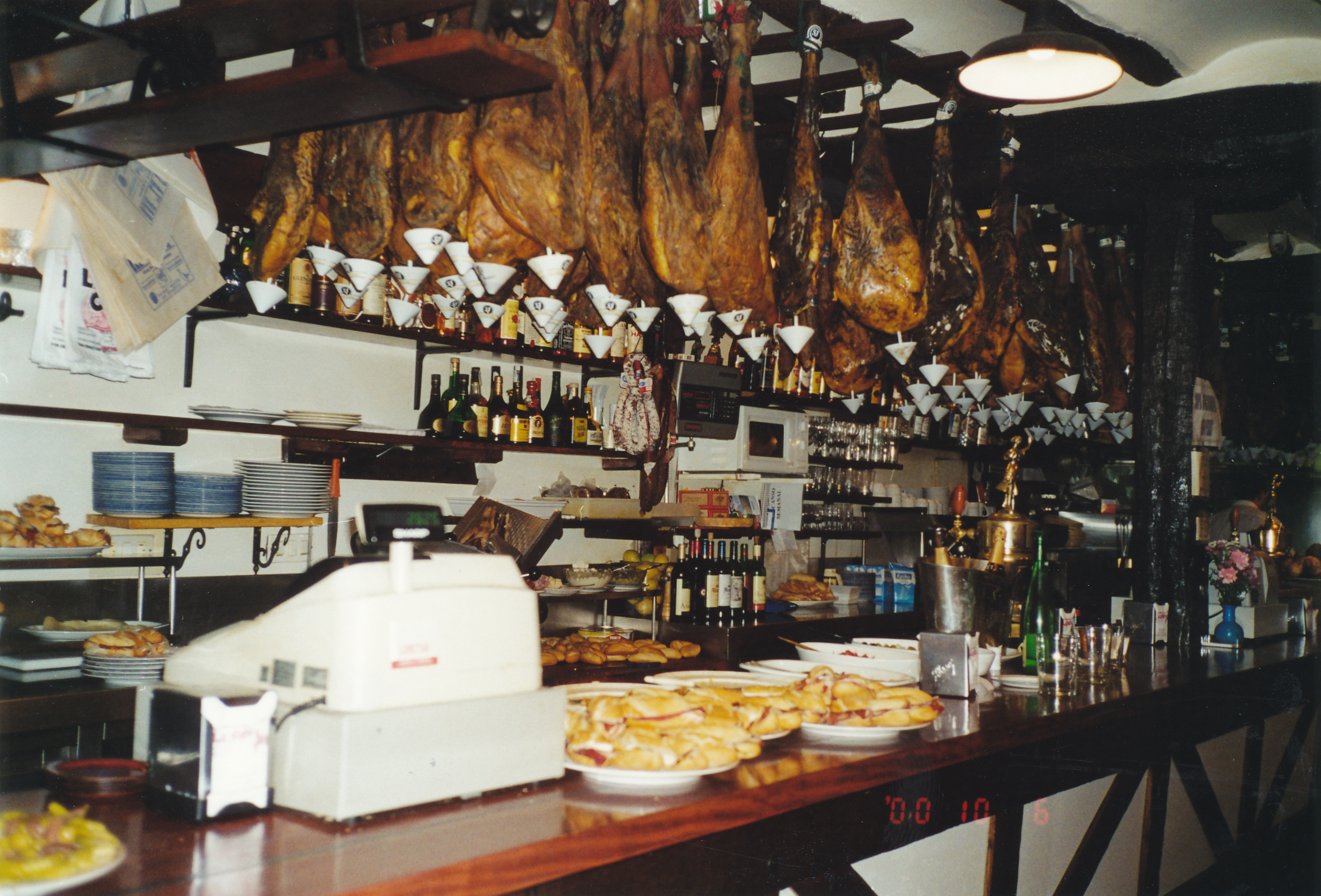
Jamón serrano and pintxos in one of the numerous bars of the Old Quarter

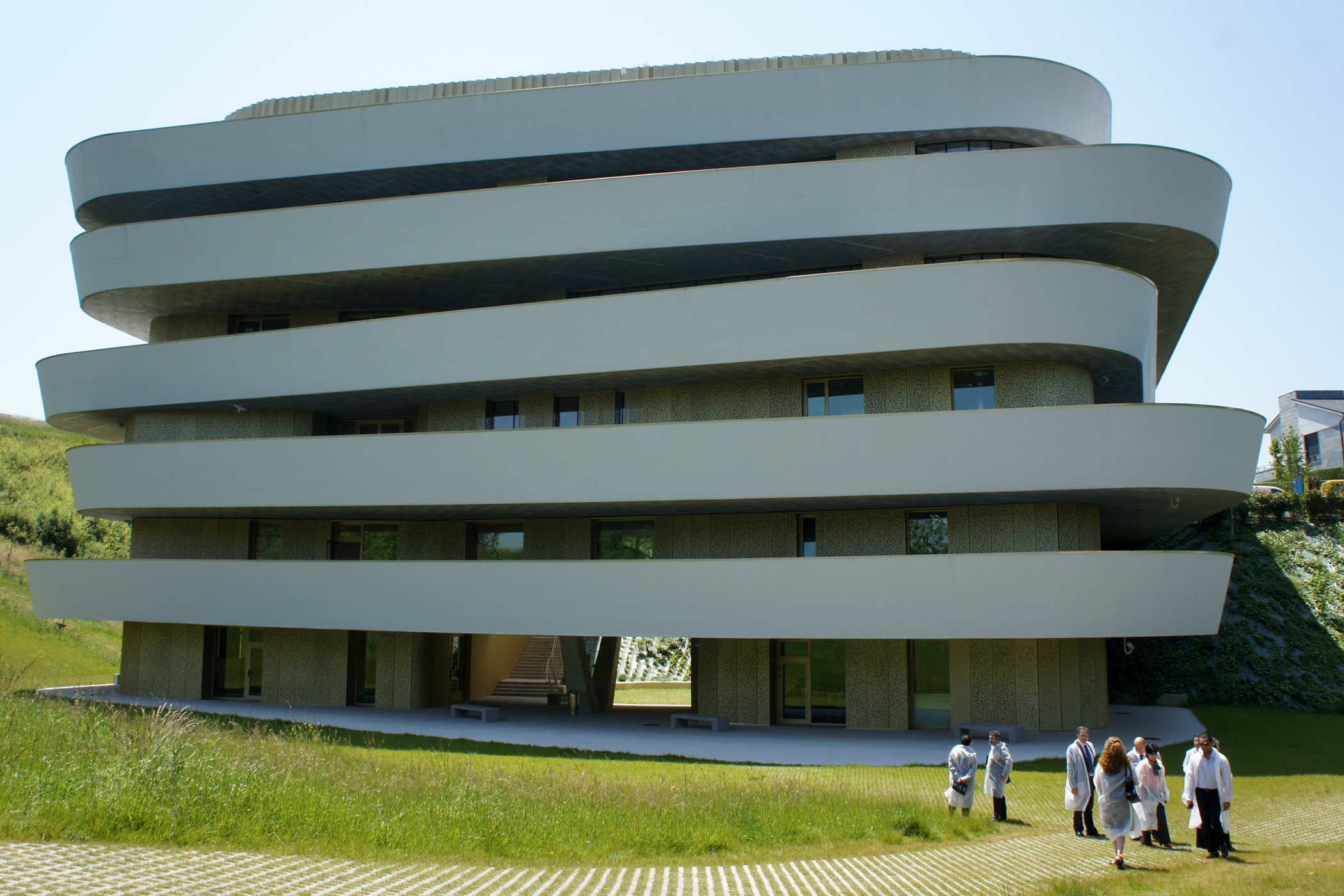
Basque Culinary Center campus

San Sebastián is renowned for its Basque cuisine. San Sebastián and the surrounding area is home to a high concentration of restaurants with Michelin stars, including Arzak (San Sebastián), Berasategui (Lasarte), Akelarre (district Igeldo) and Mugaritz (Errenteria). It is the city with the second most Michelin stars per capita in the world, after Kyoto, Japan. According to The World's 50 Best Restaurants ranking in 2013, two of the world's top ten best restaurants were in San Sebastián. As well as these restaurants, the city is known for pintxos (small-plate dishes similar to tapas) which are found in the bars of the Old Quarter and elsewhere in the city.

It is also the birthplace of Basque gastronomical societies, with the oldest recorded mention of such a txoko back in 1870. In addition, San Sebastián hosts the first institution to offer a university degree in Gastronomy, the Basque Culinary Center.

== Education ==
Donostia / San Sebastián has become an important university city. Four universities and a superior conservatory are present in the city:

- University of the Basque Country (UPV/EHU): San Sebastián hosts the Gipuzkoa Campus of the public university.
- University of Navarra: The private university has an engineering-centered campus, Tecnun, in San Sebastián.
- University of Deusto: Built in 1956, the San Sebastián campus of the private university offers different university degrees.
- Mondragon University: The pioneering Faculty of Gastronomic Sciences of this private university is located in San Sebastián.
- Musikene: The Higher School of Music of the Basque Country is located in San Sebastián.

The secondary studies activity is having an increasing impact on social, cultural, technological and economical levels of the city and surroundings. With its pushing innovative and research centers and its research strategies it is becoming one of Spain's main Science production locations, along with Barcelona, Madrid, Bilbao, Seville and Valencia, among others. Donostia / San Sebastián's scientific production covers areas like Materials Science, Cancer Research, Alzheimer and Parkinson, Architecture, Polymer Science, Biomaterials, Nanotechnology, Robotics or Informatics.

== Sport ==
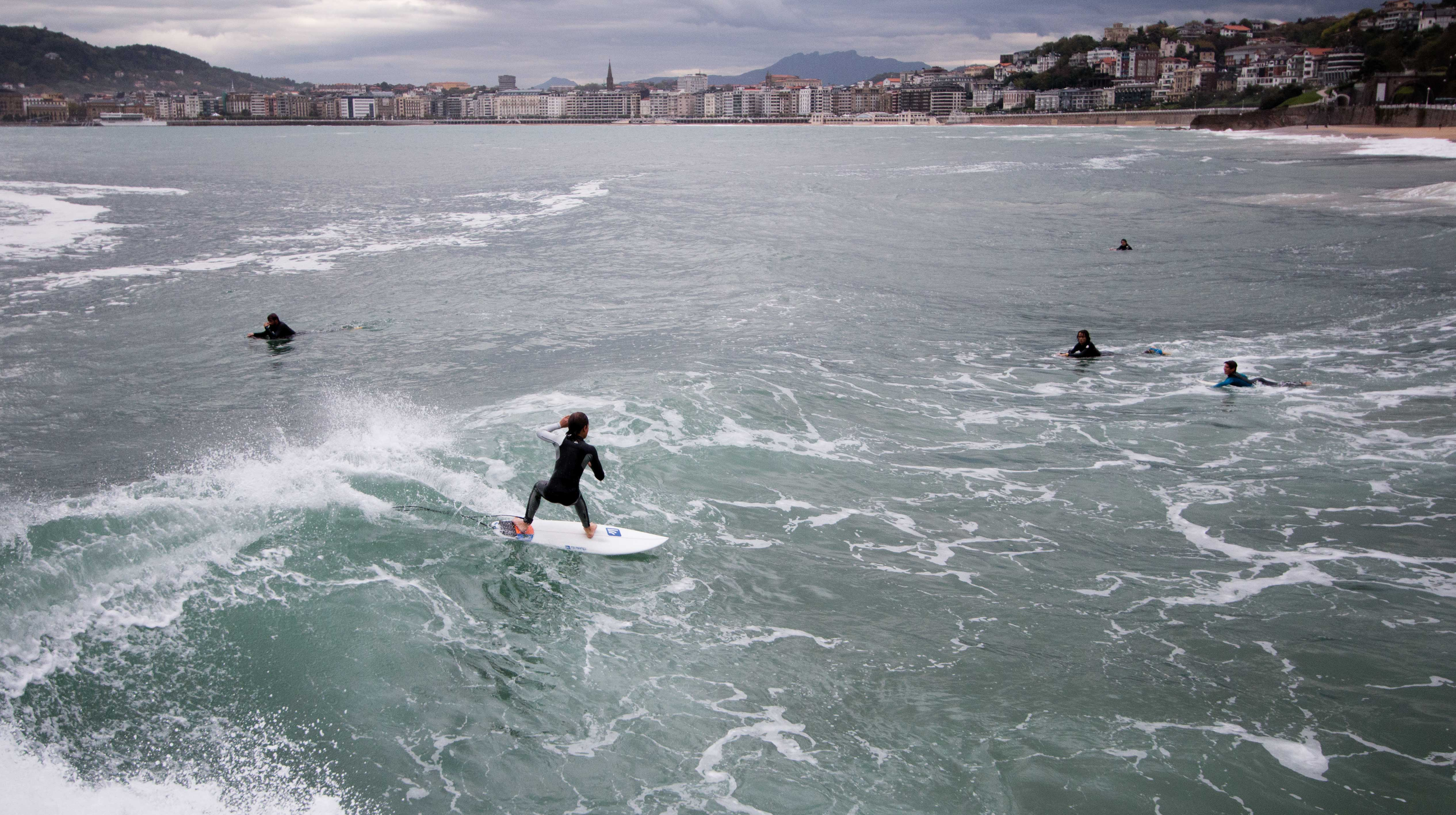
Surf in Donostia / San Sebastián

The principal football club in the city is Real Sociedad. After three seasons in the Segunda División, the club won promotion back to La Liga after winning the 2009–10 Segunda División. Real Sociedad was one of the founding members of the top division in Spanish football, La Liga. They enjoyed a particularly successful period of history in the early 1980s when they were Spanish champions for two years running (1980–81, 1981–82). In May 2019, Real Sociedad's female team won the Queen's Cup for the first time. The city's Anoeta Stadium located at the Anoeta Sports Complex is home to the Real Sociedad and also hosts rugby union matches featuring Biarritz Olympique or Aviron Bayonnais. Basketball team Gipuzkoa Basket in the LEB Oro play in the Donostia Arena in San Sebastian, and CHH Txuri Urdin, an ice hockey club in Liga Nacional de Hockey Hielo.

Each summer the city plays host to a well known cycling race, the one-day Clásica de San Sebastián ("San Sebastián Classic"). Cycling races are popular in Spain, and the Clásica de San Sebastián professional is held during early August. It has been held annually in San Sebastián since 1981. The race is part of the UCI World Tour and was previously part of its predecessors UCI ProTour and UCI Road World Cup. A women's version of the race has been held since 2019.

The handball club BM Bera Bera has won the Spanish women's Championship several times.

== Notable people ==
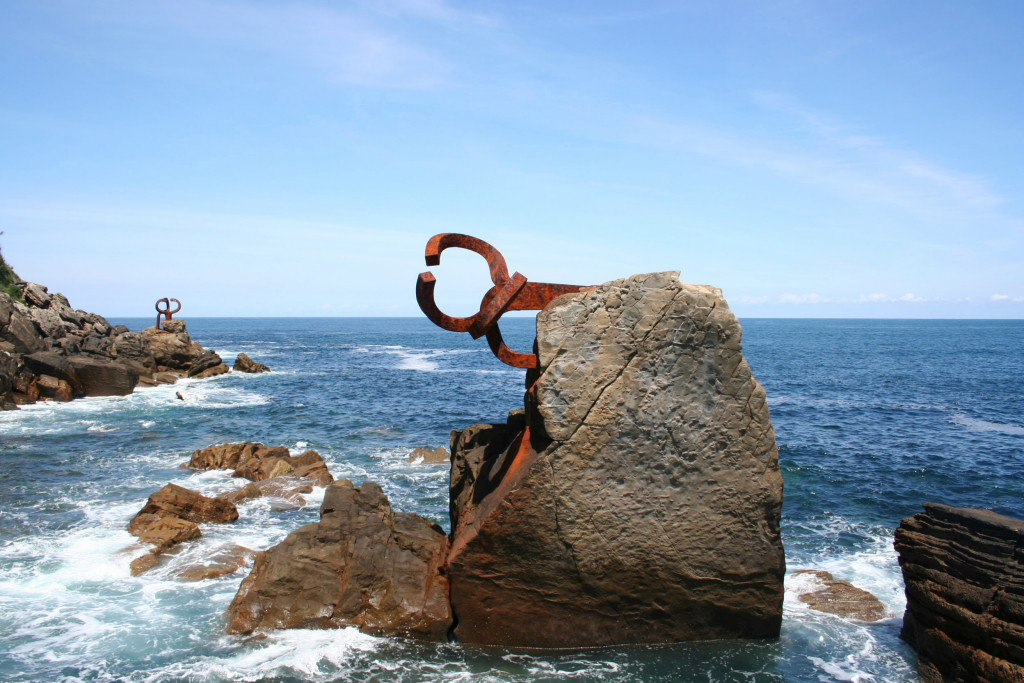
The comb of the wind: Peine del viento/Haizearen orrazia sculptures of Eduardo Chillida at the foot of the Igeldo mountain

- Mikel Arteta (born 1982), current manager and former player of English Premier League club Arsenal.
- Aritz Aduriz (born 1981), former footballer who played for Athletic Bilbao and winner of the 2015 Zarra Trophy as best domestic goalscorer in La Liga.
- Xabi Alonso (born 1981), former professional footballer born in Tolosa but raised in San Sebastián. Part of the Spain national team that won the 2010 World Cup, former manager of Spanish La Liga club Real Madrid, and current manager of Premier League club Chelsea.
- José Luis Álvarez Enparantza "Txillardegi" (1929–2012), Basque linguist, politician and writer.
- Alicia Amatriain, ballet dancer
- Gretel Ammann (1947–2000), philosopher, essayist, activist, radical feminist, lesbian separatist.
- Luis Arconada, (born 1954) former football player who played for Real Sociedad and the Spain national team as a goalkeeper.
- José de Arteche (1906–1971), author
- Serafin Baroja (1840–1912), writer, Basque culture advocate and liberal. Father of Pio Baroja.
- Pío Baroja (1872–1956), writer belonging to the Generation of '98.
- Carlos Bea, (born 1934), federal judge of the United States Court of Appeals for the Ninth Circuit
- Alvaro Bermejo (born 1959) writer and journalist, author of best sellers like The Tibetan Gospel or The Labyrint of Atlantis.
- Juan Manuel Besnes e Irigoyen (1789–1865) Uruguayan painter and calligrapher.
- Indalezio Bizkarrondo "Bilintx" (1831–1876), a romantic poet and bertsolari closely attached to the city. Died after being hit by Carlist shelling.
- Achille Broutin (1860–1918), fencer and collector of weapons.
- Eduardo Chillida (1924–2002), sculptor, notable for his monumental abstract works.
- Arantza Díaz de Ilarraza Sánchez (1957), researcher in Language Technology and Natural language processing for Basque and other languages.
- Catalina de Erauso (1585 or 1592–1650), former nun who travelled around Spain and the Americas as a man.
- Marina de Gabaráin (1917–1972), mezzo-soprano opera singer
- Iñaki Gabilondo (born 1942), journalist.
- Alberto Iglesias (born 1955), music composer.
- Judith Jauregui (born 1985), pianist.
- Mikel Laboa (1934–2008), Basque singer-songwriter.
- Juana Larando (fl. 1630), Basque privateer
- Imanol Larzabal (1947-2004), Basque singer-songwriter.
- Ramon Lazkano (born 1968), composer.
- Jesús María de Leizaola (1896–1989), President of the Basque Government in exile after 1960.
- Rebeca Linares (born 1983), Spanish pornographic actress
- Gilbert Mackereth (1892–1962), British World War I hero, holder of Military Cross for gallantry. Retired to live in San Sebastián and died there 1962, interred at San Sebastián.
- Iker Martínez de Lizarduy Lizarribar (1977–), Olympic sailor.
- Julio Medem (born 1958), film director.
- Idoia Otaegui (born 1968), lawyer, jurist, and professor who served as Deputy Minister of Justice of the Basque Government.
- Antonio Peña y Goñi (1846–1896), musicologist
- Alex Ubago (born 1981), pop songwriter and singer. Born in Vitoria but raised in San Sebastián.
- Juan Ugarte (born 1980), former professional footballer for Real Sociedad, Wrexham and Crewe Alexandra.
- Julio Urquijo Ibarra (1871–1950), Basque linguist.
- Andrés Vilariño (born 1951), racing driver
- Fernando de Villanueva (died 1679), governor of Spanish New Mexico between 1665 and 1668.
- Natalia Zabala (born 1983), Spanish beauty pageant titleholder and Miss Spain 2007
- Manuel Zamarreño Villoria (1955-1998), politician
- Martín Zubimendi (born 1999), footballer, Arsenal and Spain.

== International relations ==
=== Twin towns – sister cities ===
San Sebastián is twinned with:

- Cape Bojador, Morocco
- Marugame, Japan
- Plymouth, England
- Reno, United States
- Trento, Italy
- Wiesbaden, Germany

In addition, San Sebastián has a friendship declaration with Stepanakert, Azerbaijan (2015).

== See also ==
- Cantabrian Sea
