= Donostialdea =

Region of Gipuzkoa, Basque Country

- Eskualdea / Comarca
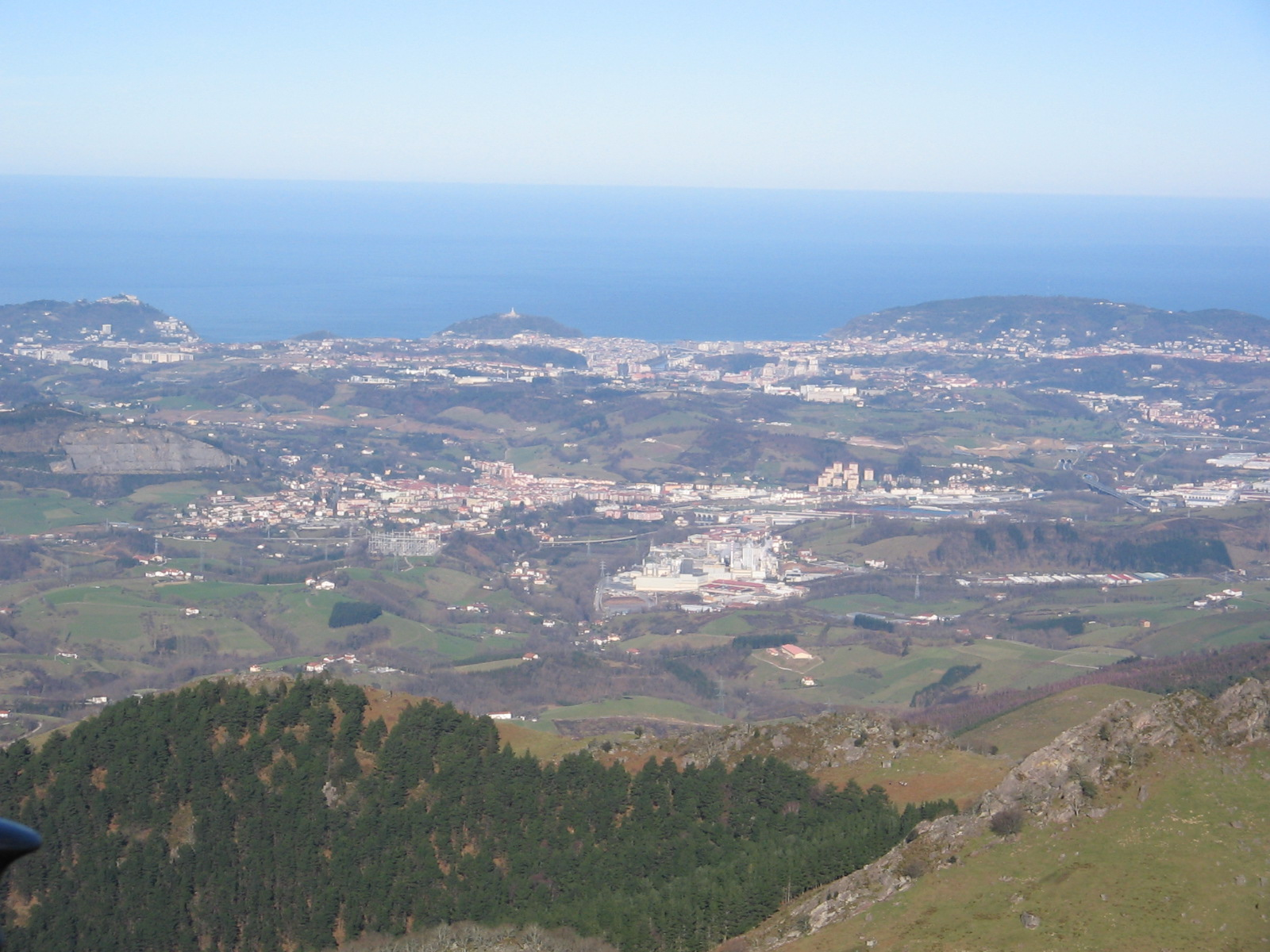
- Partial view of Donostialdea

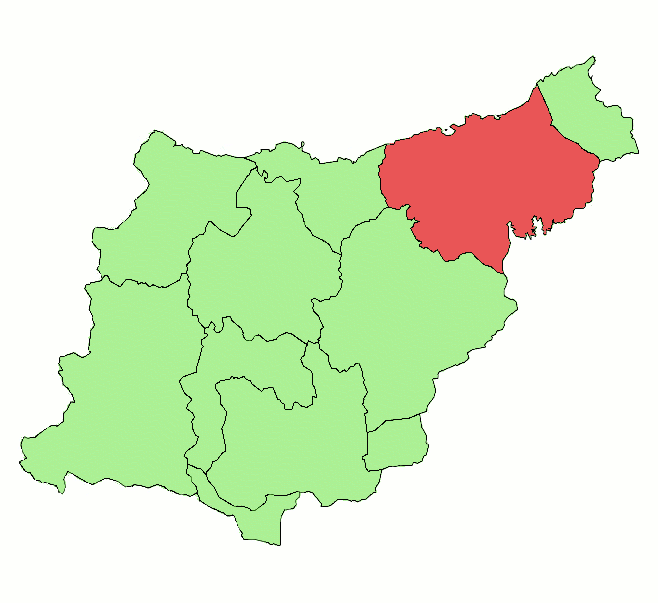
- Coordinates: 43°19′17″N 1°59′08″W
- Country: Spain
- Autonomous community: Basque Country
- Province: Gipuzkoa
- Capital: San Sebastián
- Time zone: UTC+1 (CET)
  - Summer (DST): UTC+2 (CEST)

Donostialdea is one of the eight regions of Gipuzkoa, in the Basque Autonomous Community in Spain. It corresponds to the basin of the lower Urumea River, along with a strip of basin corresponding to the Oria River. The region's name is derived from Donostia, the Basque name of San Sebastián, the capital city of Gipuzkoa. The region comprises eleven municipalities extending in an area of 305.72 km^{2} (see below, data released in 2006). It borders in the east with the region or subcomarca of Oarsoaldea, on the south with Leitzaldea or Norte de Aralar in Spanish (Navarre), on the west with Urola Kosta and on the north with the Bay of Biscay.

#	Municipality	Mayor	Party	Area km²	Population (2010)	% Population
1	San Sebastián	Eneko Goia	EAJ/PNV	60.89	185,510	57.0
2	Errenteria	Julen Mendoza Pérez	EH Bildu	32.26	39,010	12.0
3	Hernani	Luis Intxauspe Arozena	EH Bildu	39.82	19,317	5.9
4	Lasarte-Oria	Pablo Barrio Ramírez	EH Bildu	6.01	17,863	5.5
5	Pasaia	Amaya Aguirregabiria Alberdi	EH Bildu	11.34	15,988	4.9
6	Andoain	Ana Maria Karrere Zabala	EH Bildu	27.17	14,670	4.5
7	Oiartzun	Aiora Pérez de San Román	EH Bildu	59.71	9,957	3.1
8	Urnieta	Mikel Pagola Tolosa	EAJ/PNV	22.40	6,166	1.9
9	Lezo	Ainhoa Zabalo Loyarte	EH Bildu	8.59	6,034	1.9
10	Usurbil	Mertxe Aizpurua Olano	EH Bildu	25.64	6,006	1.8
11	Astigarraga	Andoni Gartzia Arruabarrena	EH Bildu	11.89	4,714	1.4
	Donostialdea			305.72	325,235	100.0

The area is served by the San Sebastián Metro, part of the Euskotren Trena network operated by Euskotren.
