= Adarra =

Mountain in the Basque Country

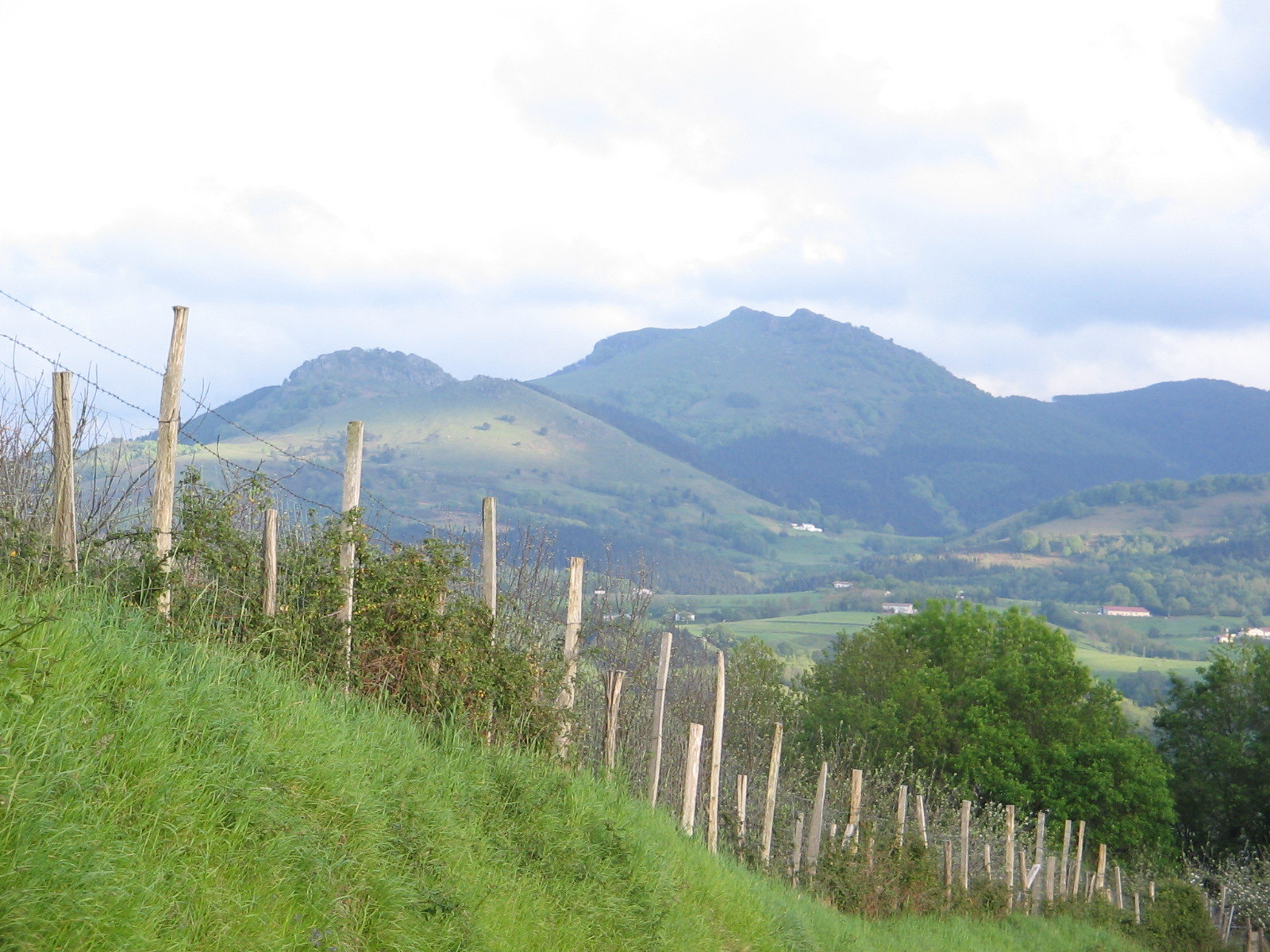
- The Aballarri rocks on the left and Adarra (centre)

Highest point
- Elevation: 811 m (2,661 ft)
- Coordinates: 43°12′25.78″N 01°57′43.9″W

Naming
- English translation: The Horn
- Language of name: Basque
- Pronunciation: Basque: [aˈdara]

Geography
- Location within Pyrenees Location within Spain
- Location: Gipuzkoa, Basque Country
- Parent range: Adarra-Mandoegi

Climbing
- Easiest route: From Besabi in Urnieta

Adarra (short for "Adarramendi", meaning 'mount of horns' in Basque) is a mountain south of the city of San Sebastian in the Basque Country. It is a popular peak with the local residents. The mountain is flanked on the north by the minor summits of Oindi or Onddi (Basque pronunciation: ['onɟi], 545 m) and Onddo (781 m) to the south, all of them located at the top of a long mountain range of modest height between the Urumea and Leitzaran valleys, which extends south right to the edge of the Navarrese town of Leitza.

== Geology and vegetation ==
The mountain stands on the westernmost end of the Pyrenees. Outcrops of slate, sandstone, conglomerates, red silt and other materials can be found on the peak, largely from the Paleozoic Era and Mesozoic Era.

On its eastern slopes, patches of indigenous forest and vegetation abound, while on the western side (especially on the way down to Leitzaran) pine tree used for logging prevails. Grassland strips used for grazing sheep and horses interspersed with forest are common.

== Prehistoric monuments ==
The mountain and the whole area show several examples of megalithic art, for the most part small monuments which are common on the Atlantic basin of the Basque Country, dating from the Neolithic and Bronze Age. 34 stone circles, four dolmens, three cists and two menhirs can be found locally, dating from the megalithic era.

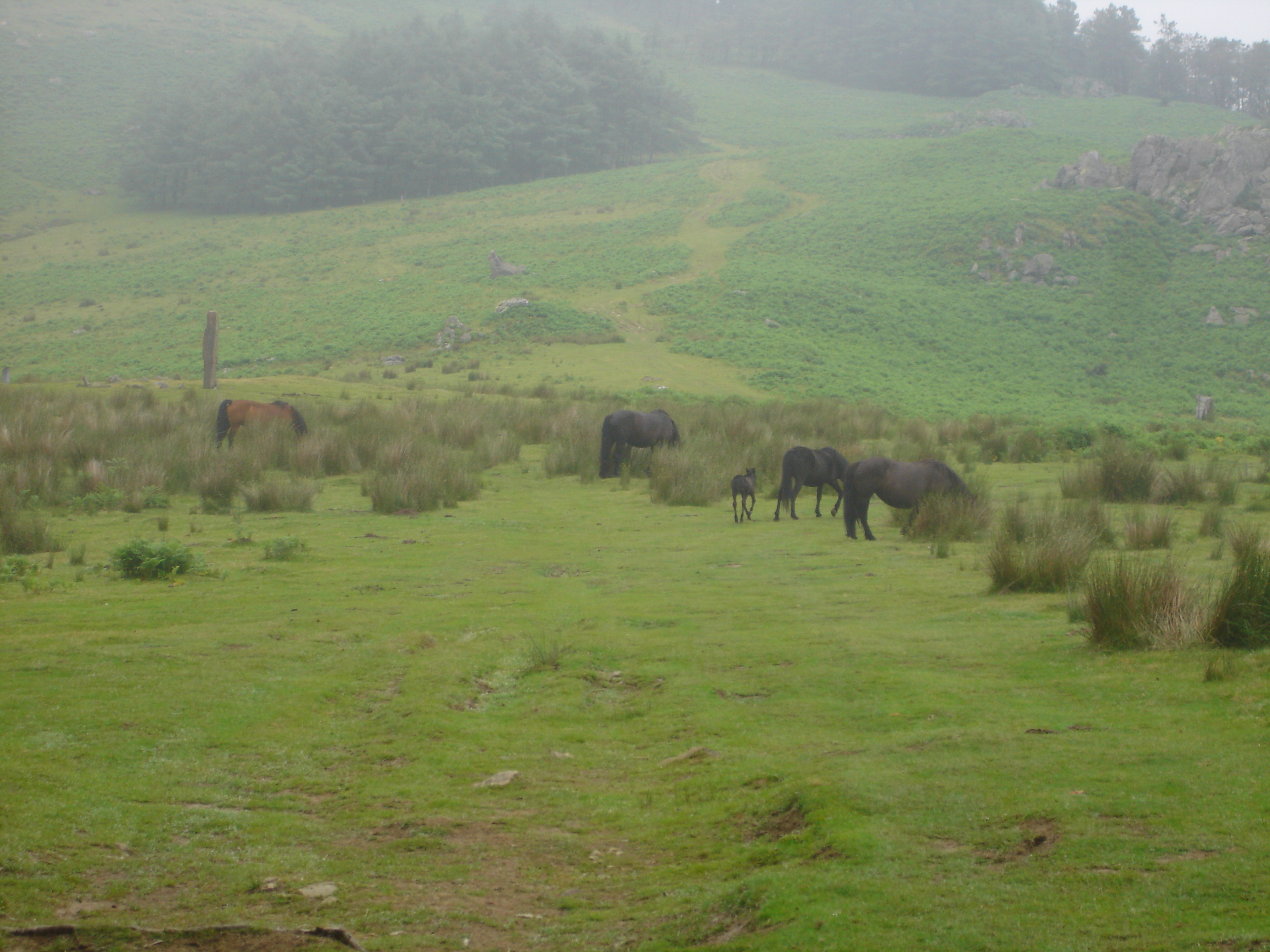
The menhir of Eteneta on the rear slopes of Adarra

According to the anthropologist Jose Miguel Barandiaran, legend states that the Basque mythological giant Sanson got angry with a crowd of people dancing in Arano, so he intended to kill them. Yet when he was about to hurl a stone at them from the mountain Buruntza, he slipped on cow dung and the stone fell short on this spot, resulting in the current stone of Eteneta.

The ancient remains of a man buried with a dog and lamb were unearthed in a local cavern, dating from around 4,000 BC. The surroundings of the cavern are currently somewhat in a poor condition due to a polluted stream nearby.

== Events ==
Early on New Years Day, people of all ages, the bravest of whom had been celebrating the night before, pour into Adarra to see the sunrise or just to start the year in a good way. Some people may carry music instruments, including a trikitixa, tabor and pipe, etc. to enliven the atmosphere.

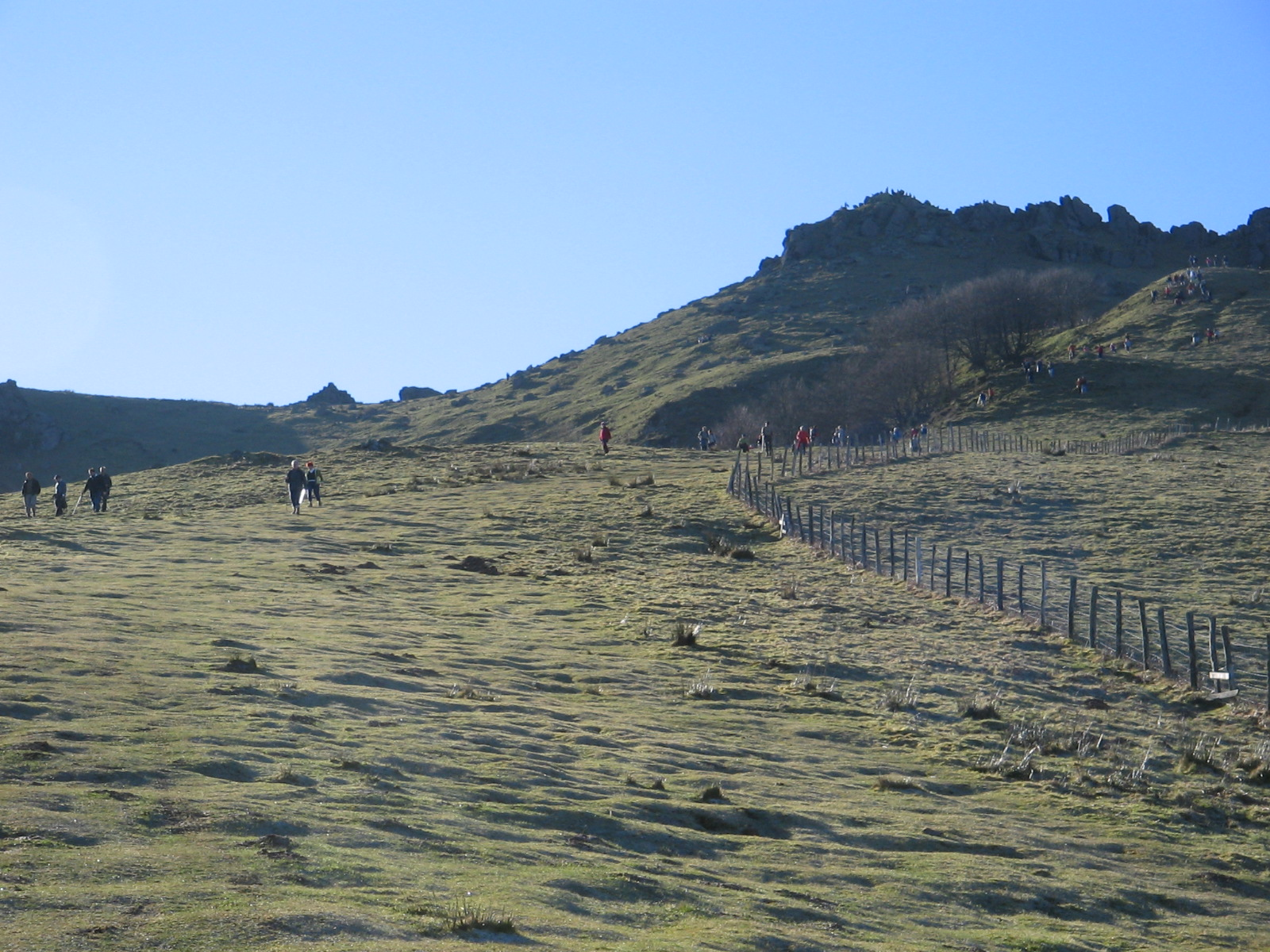
Trail of people on the way up to Adarra and back on 1 January

== Access points and trails ==
=== Besabi ===
The main access point lies at the farmstead-turned-inn Besabi. In order to get there by car, starting from a T junction at the road GI-311 (Andoain-Urnieta), the minor road GI-3121 leads to the hamlet Xoxoka, where turning left the road GI-4721 heads to Besabi. A car-park is located at the end of the road. A cement paved track gradually gains height until a farmhouse with a yard. A wooden barrier opens the way into a beaten mud trail with a steady inclination across the forest.

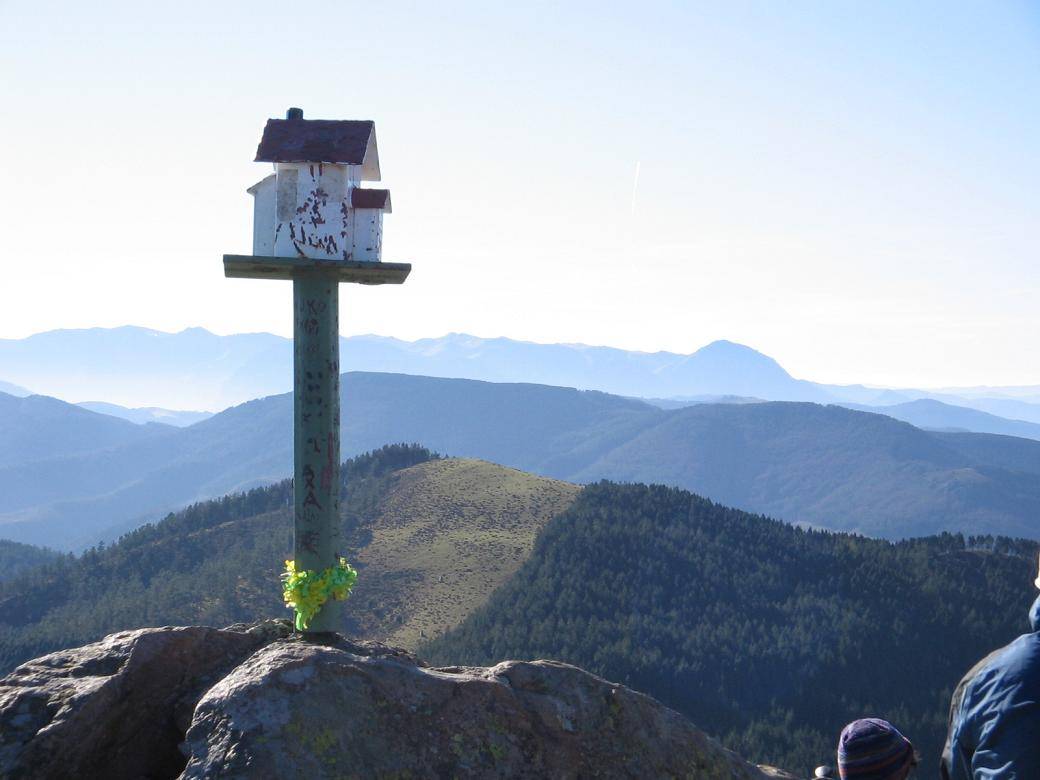
Summit of Adarra with Onddo in the foreground; Aralar and the outline of Txindoki in the distance

A stream is crossed and height is gained slowly out of the forest on to the fields. Overcoming the last south-bound stretch to the summit does not take very long, but it is demanding. Right before the summit heaps of stone in a karst terrain cover the trail.

For the descent, walking down the southern side of Adarra the Col of Eteneta is reached, where a prehistoric (menhir) rises proud. This spot has been for ages a landmark for shepherds. Turning direction and heading northwest, the meadows give way to bushy landscape and a patch of narrow paths, soon merging into one. The trails cut through the western side of Adarra until the beech forest of the ascent is again attained.

Another option back consists of heading down from Adarra straight to the north, the pass of Mantale is reached south of the Aballarri rocks (small dolmen and other vestiges around).

The trail opens its way out of the rocks, then a dramatic slope leads down to a concrete track that heads west back to Besabi.

=== Leitzaran ===
From Andoain, the GI-3091 road penetrates into the valley Leitzaran along the river. The former rail course has been arranged as a green way for bicycles and pedestrians. After a tunnel is passed a narrow signposted trail twists up out of the main track among pine trees.
