= Hernani, Spain =

Hernani
- Municipality
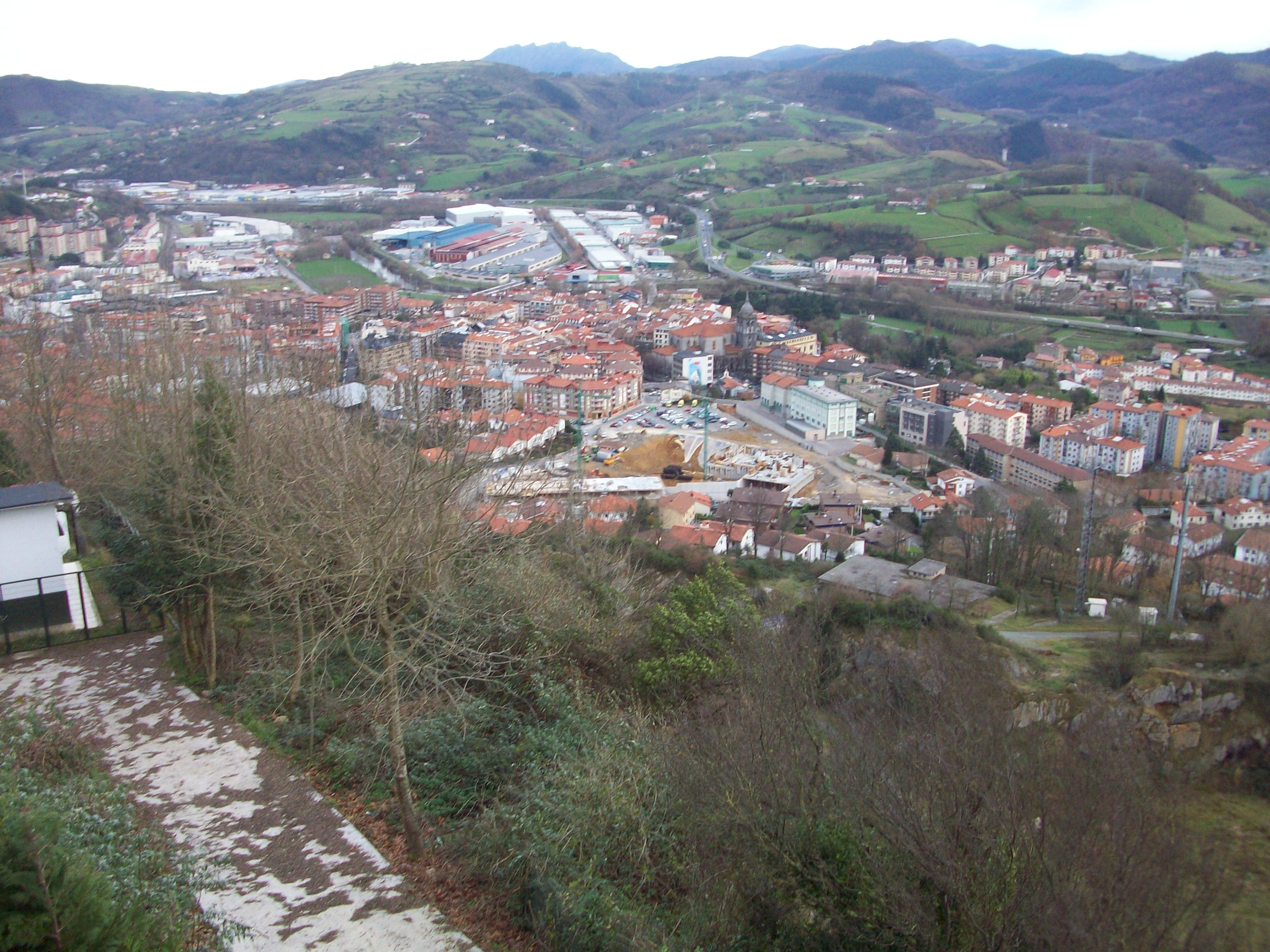
- Hernani

- Coat of arms

- Location in the Basque Country in Spain
- Coordinates: 43°15′58″N 1°58′30″W
- Country: Spain
- Autonomous Community: Basque Country
- Province: Gipuzkoa
- Eskualdea: Donostialdea

Government
  - Mayor: Luis Intxauspe Arozena (EH Bildu)

Area
  - Total: 40 km^{2} (15 sq mi)
- Elevation (AMSL): 44 m (144 ft)

Population (2025-01-01)
  - Total: 20,375
  - Density: 510/km^{2} (1,300/sq mi)
- Time zone: UTC+1 (CET)
  - Summer (DST): UTC+2 (CEST (GMT +2))
- Postal code: 20120
- Area code: +34 (Spain) + 943 (Gipuzkoa)
- Website: www.hernani.eus

Hernani is a town and municipality located in the province of Gipuzkoa, Basque Autonomous Community, Spain. The town sits on the left bank of the Urumea river. It is located at a distance of 9.2 km from San Sebastián. The municipality of Hernani occupies an area of approximately 40 square kilometres and is bordered by San Sebastián, Astigarraga, Arano, Elduayen, Errenteria, Lasarte-Oria and Urnieta.

From the town centre, at the foot of Mount Santa Barbara, it is possible to see a large area of the valley of Urumea. Its festivities, held between 23 and 27 June in honour of John the Baptist; and between his celebrations the popular "azeri dantza" (also celebrated in celebrations of Carnival) should be emphasized.

The title character of Victor Hugo's play Hernani is named after the town.

== History ==
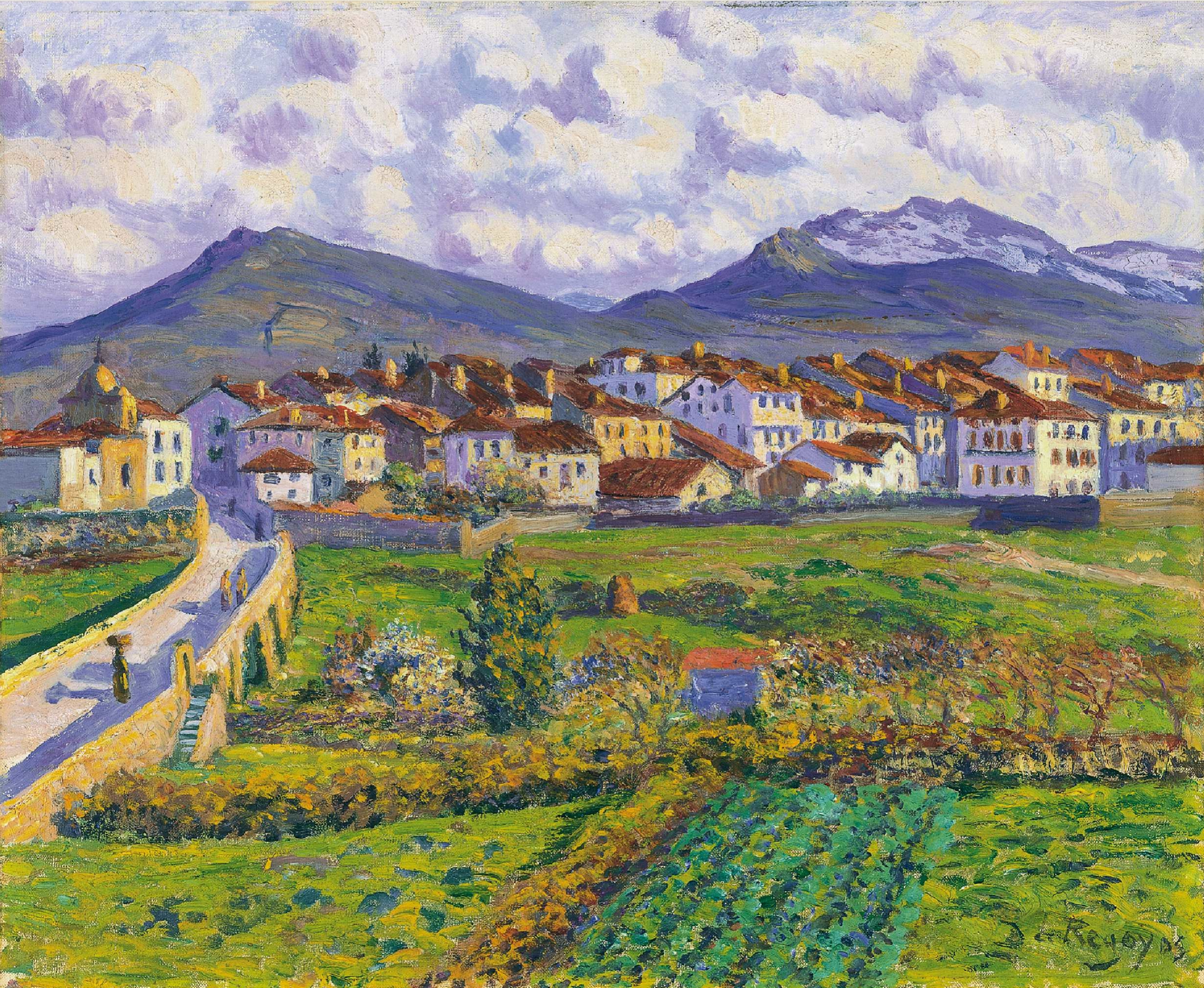
Darío de Regoyos, Hernani landscape, 1900 (Málaga, Carmen Thyssen Museum).

During the Middle Ages, the territory that would form the province of Gipuzkoa was divided in valleys and Hernani was one of them. The valley of Hernani formerly extended through all the space surrounding the lower courses of the rivers Urumea and Oria.

The valley of Hernani is first attested in a document whereby the Castilian count Fernán González of Castile grants vows in favour of the Monasteries of San Millan de la Cogolla, dating from the year 938 but believed to be a fake document from the thirteenth century. Dated from the late twelfth century, the donation document of the Monastery of San Sebastián to the Monastery of Leyre in Navarre by the king Sancho VI of Navarre states that the monastery of San Sebastián was in the borders of Hernani.

When this Navarrese king founded the town of San Sebastián around 1180, the territory of the valley of Hernani was included within the jurisdiction of the new coastal town. It is not known when Hernani turned into a town, with its charter being lost in a fire along with other files. Some assume that the foundation of the town occurred during the reign of the king Alfonso X of Castile in the second half of the 13th century, when this king established a network of strategic towns dotting the route reaching the coast of Gipuzkoa, with Hernani as one of its strategic localities. Others delay the foundation of the town until the late 14th century in 1379, as a document of the 15th century cites an agreement between the councils of Hernani and San Sebastián for the use of the mountains of the valley of Urumea that took place in 1379, which attests to the existence by that time of the town Hernani.

The town of Hernani extended its jurisdiction only to part of the old valley. It lost all the coastal and lower valley of Urumea now included in the San Sebastián strip, and the western area in the valley of the Oria, which became the town of Usurbil in 1371. Its western limit continued to be the Oria river, while on the east the mountains separated it from Oiartzun. The old town of Hernani sits on a 42 metres high rise towering over the left bank of the river Urumea and in turn located at the foot of Mount Santa Barbara. The old town was oval in shape, surrounded by walls with several entrances, of which only one (in Felipe Sagarna "Zapa" street) is surviving to date. It was originally made up of two streets, the High Street, Kale Nagusia, and Kardaberaz Street, intersected at the same time by a perpendicular lane (streets Nafarroa and its extension Felipe Sagarna "Zapa").

The first municipal ordinances go back to 1542, since copies of the 1512 ordinances disappeared during an invasion of the French army. The town has been subject to invasions and destruction numerous times throughout its history: the medieval factional wars, French invasions in the seventeenth, eighteenth and nineteenth centuries; as well as the hard sieges during the Carlist Wars and finally the 1936 Spanish Civil War. In October 1936, Hernani was the site of a massacre of 200 civilians perpetrated by the nationalist forces.

In 1986, Lasarte, a historical district of Hernani located in the valley of Oria, detached from the town following its rapid urban and demographic development.

== Culture ==
=== Language ===
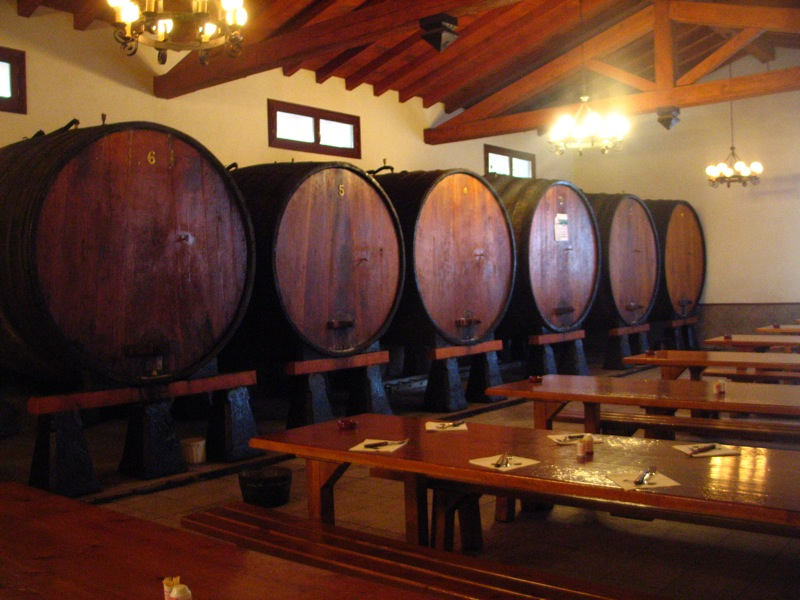
Inside of a Sagardotegi

The town lies on a traditionally Basque-speaking area, with the municipality showing a Basque-Spanish bilingual landscape.

=== Leisure ===
Hernani is the biggest and most important of the towns with strong tradition in the artisan production of Basque cider. Together with Astigarraga and Usúrbil it is one of the areas where most of the Gipuzkoan cider houses (called sagardotegiak) are concentrated. There are many of these establishments in the city. During cider season (traditionally starting the Friday before 20 January and lasting until the end of May) the locality welcomes numerous visitors who come from Gipuzkoa and neighbouring provinces to the cider houses. The bars of the old town of Hernani usually have a special animation during the weekends this time thanks to these visitors.

=== Celebration ===
The town festivities are held at the end of June, coinciding with the feast of St. John the Baptist (24 June). It is traditional that on the days 24, 25 and 26 June, coinciding with the celebrations, the previously mentioned Maskuri-danza (dance of the bladder) or Azeri-danza (dance of the fox) is held, a traditional dance, and now mostly known by the latter name because in the 1980s, a character with a mask made of a fox who accompanied him was added.

The neighbourhoods of Hernani also celebrate their own festivals: Elizatxo Santa Cruz, Ereñozu San Antonio, Santa Barbara San Ignacio, El Puerto, the martyrdom of John the Baptist and Zikuñaga the Virgin of Zikuñaga.

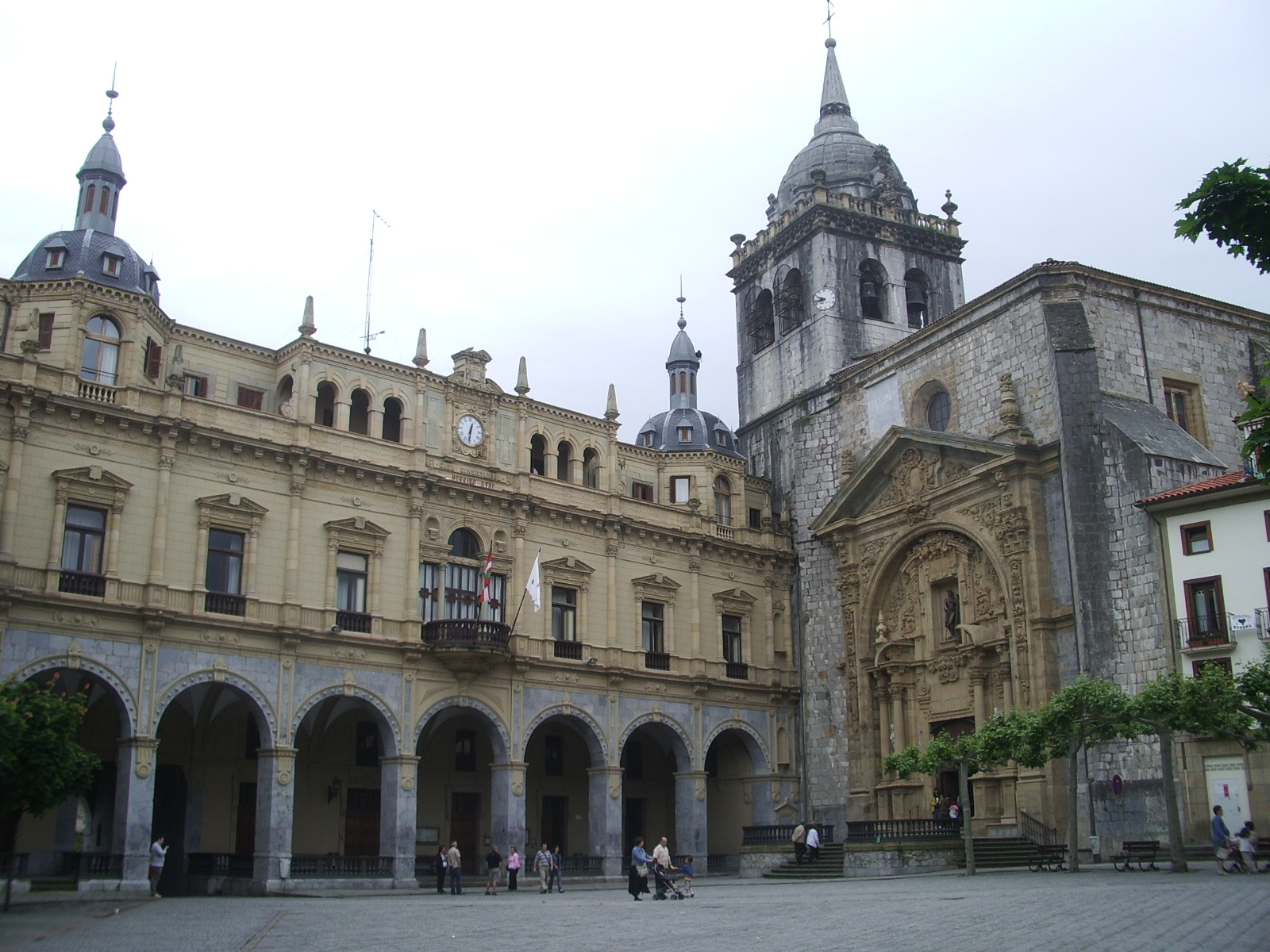
Gudaris square. Parochial Church of San Juan Bautista and Town Hall.

=== Monuments ===
The town of Hernani, formerly walled, is cataloged as Monumental Ensemble. Inside the medieval layout of the streets and some buildings of interest it is preserved.

- Religious monuments
  - Parochial Church of San Juan Bautista.
  - Convent of San Agustin.
  - Igoin-Akola Dolmen.
  - Cromlechs.
  - Civil monuments
  - Town Hall.
  - Fort of Santa Barbara.
  - Tower-house of the Gentiles (or Portalondo).
  - Laundry and public source of Leoka.
  - Gateway to the village in the canton of Zapa.

=== Museums ===
The Chillida Leku museum in Hernani is devoted to the work of sculptor Eduardo Chillida, who was born in San Sebastián.

== Demography ==
From the 1960s, there was a great increase in population, due mainly to the influx of workers from other regions of Spain (Castilla y Leon, Andalusia and Extremadura, mainly), attracted by work in the industry area. This growth paused by the crisis in the industry and the political situation in the late 70s and early 80s.

In 1986 came the disengagement of the district of Lasarte, which became part of a newly created town called Lasarte-Oria. That disengagement represented a loss of about 10,000 inhabitants in Hernani. In the last 20 years the population has remained fairly stable.

== Economy ==
According to the Eustat there are 8722 jobs in the municipality (data as of 1-1-2010), equivalent to 45% of the total population of Hernani. The industrial sector comprises about 45% of the jobs with 240 industrial work centers registered in the municipality.

The population works primarily in the service sector, which employs 62% of the population, the industry employs 26% and the construction sector 10%. Only 1% is currently engaged in farming. (Data 2001). In 2005 the unemployment rate was around 9% of the labour force, a higher percentage than in the region. The per capita income in Hernani is approximately between 85% and 90% of the average income of Gipuzkoa and the region of San Sebastian.

The services sector covers the needs of a population of 18,000 inhabitants with regard to commerce, hospitality and utilities that are quite covered. Despite its proximity to San Sebastián, Hernani is not a city-dormitory of the capital and most of its population carries out its life and covers its basic needs in the town itself. Only for certain types of commerce and services more specialized the inhabitants usually go to the nearby capital or the commercial center of Usurbil.

Hernani is a heavily industrialized city with some 240 industrial companies surveyed located along the banks of the river Urumea (polygons Landare, Ibaiondo, Zikuñaga, Eziago, Ibarluze). Hernani industry is very diversified. The major companies located in Hernani are the cooperative Orona, dedicated to the manufacture and installation of elevators, which has more than 800 employees on its payroll and paper company veteran Papelera Guipuzcoana de Zicuñaga, located in the district namesake. Hernani industry also includes numerous chemical companies.

The following companies of Hernani have more than 50 workers according to the Basque Industrial Catalog:

- Arkema Chemistry: making PVC. It belongs to a multinational group
- Tapes Ubis: tapes
- Goiplastik: plastic injection components. It belongs to Gureak Group employs mentally handicapped.
- Jesus Romero and Sons: DC motors and electronic equipment of regulation and management. Repair and maintenance of electrical machinery.
- Krosaki AMR Refractories: the production of refractory materials. It belongs to the Japanese company Krosaki Harima.
- Loire SAFE: machine tools .
- Oiarso (Bexen): medical equipment for single use. It is a cooperative of Mondragon Corporation
- Orona elevators, ramps, walkways, escalators and lifts. It's another Mondragon Cooperative Group.
- Papelera Guipuzcoana de Zicuñaga (Iberpapel Group): paper company.
- Special Profiles Selak (Savera Group): rolling metal profiles
- Society of Packages, Tubes and Cases (SETE): tubular aluminum containers .

Formerly of great importance in the local economy was the steel company Pedro Orbegozo, founded in the 1950s, which came to employ almost 1,500 workers, most of them hernaniarras. The company closed in 1992 after a long crisis and its closing had a strong impact on the local economy. In the place where it was located formerly this company is currently Ibaiondo Polygon.

== Gastronomy ==
- The specialty of the region is wild boar on cider
- During the cider season the sagardotegiak offer a traditional menu of cod fish omelette or cod fish with peppers and steak. For dessert, Idiazabal cheese, quince jelly and walnuts are served. Hernani is home to around one hundred cider houses.

== Media ==
- Hernaniko kronika, the only Basque-language daily newspaper.
- Molotoff Irratia, a free radio station.

== Neighbourhoods ==
- Akarregi
- Antziola
- Elizatxo
- Epele
- Ereñotzu
- Etxeberri

- Florida
- Galarreta
- Jauregi
- Karabel
- Karobieta
- Latsunbe

- Lizeaga
- Mañe i Flaquer
- Marieluts
- Martindegi
- Osinaga
- Pagoaga

- Portu
- Sagastialde
- Sagastialdeberri
- Santa Barbara
- Sorgintxulo
- Zikuñaga

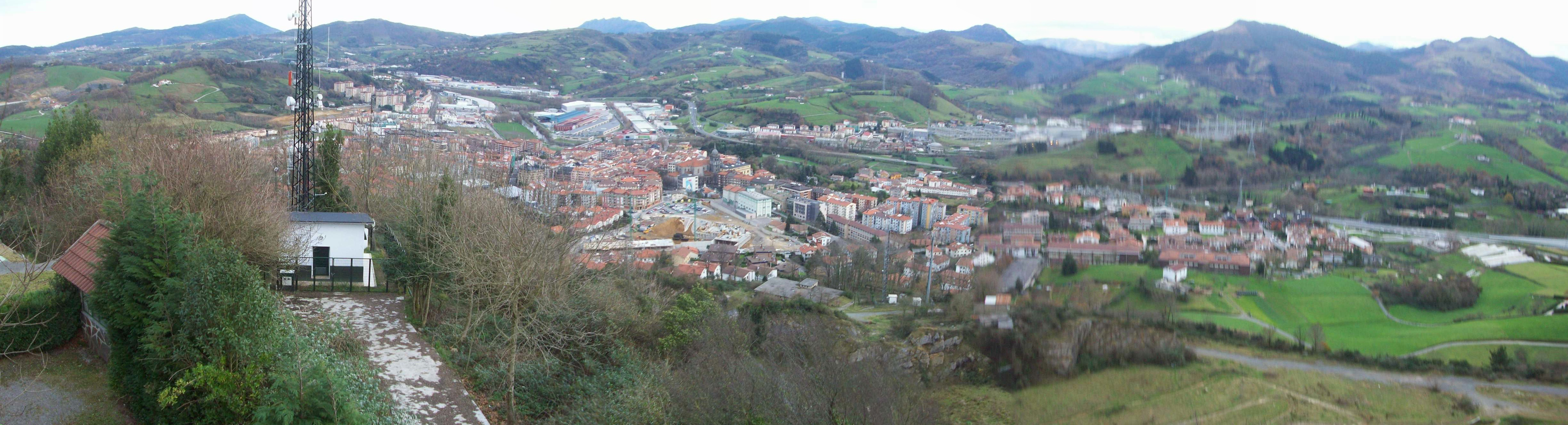
Panoramic image of Hernani from the Fortress of Santa Barbara

== Sports ==
Club Deportivo Hernani is the town's football team. The club was founded in 1940. In 1955 it reached the Spanish Third Division of football. Its highest ranking was the Second Division B in 1991.

Hernani Club de Rugby Elkartea (HCRE) is a highly respected rugby team playing in the Spanish Division of Honour. Its best result was in the 1983/84 season when it ranked second. The team is known for forming a lot of local players and bringing them out to the top division.

== Famous people ==
- José Manuel Ochotorena (1961–2025) : Spanish professional footballer and coach who played as a goalkeeper. He won the European Cup and La Liga with Real Madrid, later served as goalkeeping coach for Valencia CF and the Spain national football team.
- Juan de Urbieta (?–1553) : infantry soldier who imprisoned Francis I of France in the Battle of Pavia in 1525.
- Florentino Goikoetxea, Basque smuggler, who guided Allied airmen shot down in occupied Europe across the border from France to neutral Spain during World War II.
- José Manuel Lujambio, Txirrita (1860–1936): bertsolari, a singer of improvised musical verses in Basque. Champion of the Basque Country in 1936.
- Maialen Lujanbio (1976– ), bertsolari, a singer of improvised musical verses in Basque. Champion of the Basque Country in 2009 and 2017.
- Gabriel Celaya (1911–1991): poet of the post war generation.
- Elías Querejeta (1934–2013): filmmaker, producer, director and screenwriter.
