= Usurbil =

- Municipality
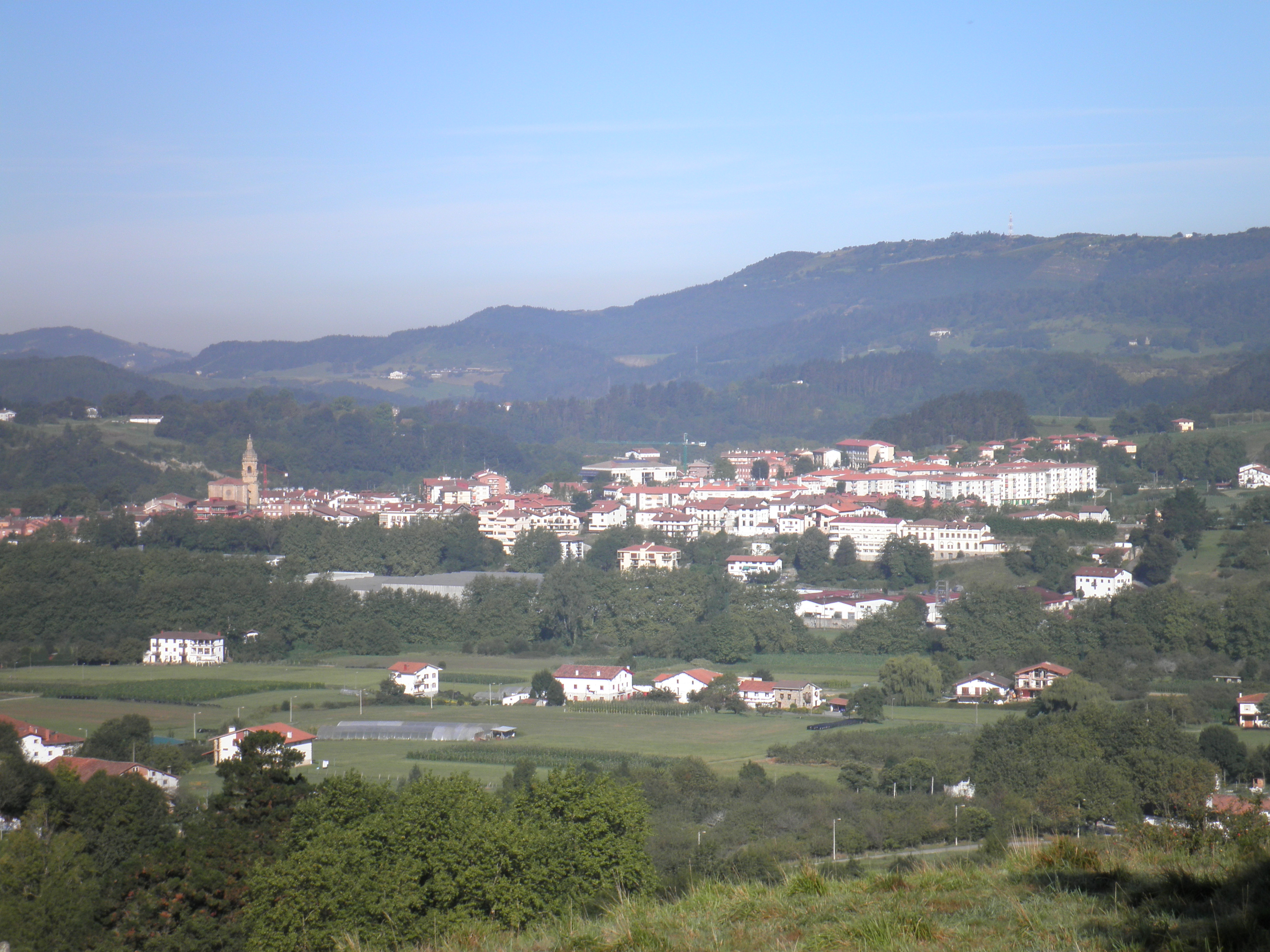

- Coat of arms

- Location of Usurbil within the Basque Country Location of Usurbil within Spain
- Coordinates: 43°16′00″N 2°03′00″W
- Country: Spain
- Autonomous community: Basque Country
- Province: Gipuzkoa
- Comarca: Donostialdea
- Founded: September 11, 1371

Government
  - Mayor: Xabier Arregi (Bildu)

Area
  - Total: 25.64 km^{2} (9.90 sq mi)

Population (2025-01-01)
  - Total: 6,488
  - Density: 253.0/km^{2} (655.4/sq mi)
- Demonym: Basque: usurbildarra
- Time zone: UTC+1 (CET)
  - Summer (DST): UTC+2 (CEST)
- Postal code: 20170
- Official language(s): Basque; Spanish
- Website: Official website

Usurbil (Spanish: Usúrbil) is a town and region located in the province of Gipuzkoa in the Autonomous Community of the Basque Country, in the North of Spain.

It lies in an area well known for its sagardotegiak (cider houses) and the area adjacent to the river for its eels.

== Geography ==
=== Boroughs ===
- At the centre of the town are the old boroughs of Elizalde, Kaxkoa, Kaleberri usually simply called Usurbil. Most of the population is concentrated here.
- Aginaga is an area of the town associated with eel fishing and on the road from Usurbil to Orio. It has some 450 inhabitants and forms its own parish.
- Atxegalde district is located next to the motorway. It has around 500 inhabitants.
- Txikierdi is a small settlement near Lasarte-Oria. It is surrounded by industrial units and forms the Urbil Industrial Estate.
- Kalezar is a borough near the centre along a street leading onto the hill that dominates the valley of the Oria. It is the location of a medieval settlement and its name translates as "the old street". It has about 650 inhabitants.
- Urdaiaga (or San Esteban) is located on the western edge of the town. Its traditional name is of Urdaiaga but is more commonly known by the name of the church. It has 175 inhabitants.
- Santu Enea is located on the western bank of the Oria river. It has slightly over 500 inhabitants.
- Zubieta is a district split between the municipalities of San Sebastián and Usurbil. Zubieta is on the western bank of the Oria river and is an enclave of San Sebastián between Usurbil and Lasarte-Oria.
- Txoko Alde
- Santu-Enea

=== Neighbouring areas ===
To the north Usurbil borders San Sebastián's Igeldo and Añorga boroughs, to the east Lasarte-Oria and Zubieta in the southeast. In the south it borders Zizurkil and to the west Aia and Orio. San Sebastián, the capital of the region is about 11 km away, Lasarte-Oria 2 km and Orio 10 km.

=== Climate ===
Climate data for Usurbil
| Month | Jan | Feb | Mar | Apr | May | Jun | Jul | Aug | Sep | Oct | Nov | Dec | Year |
|---|---|---|---|---|---|---|---|---|---|---|---|---|---|
| Daily mean °C (°F) | 8 (46) | 9 (48) | 10 (50) | 12 (54) | 14 (57) | 17 (63) | 19 (66) | 20 (68) | 18 (64) | 15 (59) | 11 (52) | 8 (46) | 13 (55) |
| Average precipitation mm (inches) | 115 (4.5) | 94 (3.7) | 98 (3.9) | 138 (5.4) | 111 (4.4) | 108 (4.3) | 83 (3.3) | 100 (3.9) | 123 (4.8) | 151 (5.9) | 170 (6.7) | 134 (5.3) | 1,425 (56.1) |
Source: Weatherbase,

== History ==
The oldest traces of human presence of the area are on the mountain called Andatza which has numerous neolithic tumuli and menhirs.

It is commonly believed that what is currently Usurbil formerly formed part of the administrative region of Hernani which extended into the area between the river Urumea and Oria.

The oldest inhabited area appears to have been on the left bank of the Urumea, broadly corresponding to the modern Urdaiaga. In a document dating back to the 13th century there is mention of a Monasterio de San Esteban which has by now disappeared but forms the foundation of the present day hermitage of San Esteban. Next to the monastery the tower-house of Urdaiaga was constructed in the 14th century which gave the area its name.

During the 12th century an important tract of land in Usurbil was donated to a monastery of Orreaga in Navarre. They remained with the monastery until they were confiscated by Mendizabal in 1836. Following their confiscation the area of Mount Irisasi and Andatza were forested and form one of the best preserved areas of forest in Gipuzkoa even today.

In 1180 King Sancho VI of Navarre added Usurbil and most of Zubieta into the boroughs of San Sebastián. At that time the population was living in small scattered settlements which formed the nuclei of modern-day Urdaiaga and Aginaga and the parish church was built in its present location. The most powerful family were the Atxegas who owned a tower-house next to a strategic river crossing on the Oria.

This situation remained until 1371 when the Castilian King Henry II of Castile granted the right to the inhabitants of San Salvador to form a new settlement called Belmonte de Usurbil, independent of San Sebastián. The new settlement was built on a hill some distance away from the Oria river and the parish church to avoid the influence of the Atxega family, leaving the church halfway between the new settlement and the Atxega tower-house. The borders continued to shift, Oria originally forming part of Usurbil until 1379 when it became an independent town. The areas on the western bank of the Oria also were not part of the town originally.

Towards the end of the 14th century the borough of Zubieta was given the choice between remaining with San Sebastián or joining Usurbil. 14 households stayed with San Sebastián, the remaining 7 joined Usurbil.

The old layout of Belmonte de Usurbil was simple, essentially consisting of two parallel streets. It corresponds well with the modern borough of Kalezar.

In 1486 a fire broke out and destroyed Belmonte de Usurbil completely. As the power of the Atxega family had waned, Belmonte was also less importance and during the 16th century the other boroughs of Aginaga, Urdaiaga, Zubieta and Elizalde began to challenge the privileges held by Belmonte, such as the prohibition of setting up slaughterhouses outside the town walls. Especially Aginaga initiated numerous court cases.

As the old centre declined, new areas developed that would one day become the centre of the town. The borough of Elizalde - Basque for "side of the church" – started out as a small number of houses built against the church walls. As a result of the incessant legal challenges between Aginaga and Belmonte, the town council relocated to Elizalde in 1672 and by the end of the 17th century, Belmonte and Elizalde were already of a similar size.

The changing place names also bear witness to this power shift, with Kaleberri (new street) now contrasting with Belmonte's new name, Kalezar (old street).

In 1826 Usurbil formed a union with neighboring Orio and Zizurkil, the Union of Andatzabea, to pay for a common representative to the Gipuzkoako Batzar Nagusiak or Grand Council of Gipuzkoa.

== Economy ==
The traditional industries of Usurbil were ironware, anchor and ship building, making use of the surrounding abundance of woodland. At the shipyards of Mapil in Aginaga ships for the Spanish Navy were built.

Industrialisation arrived in Usurbil in 1934 when a Michelin tire factory was built between Usurbil and Hernani, giving work to many locals. Due to the distance Usurbil itself was not majorly affected but Lasarte, which was much closer, changed radically and grew into a town of some 20,000 inhabitants. Despite lower production, the factory continues to be a major employer in the area with some 1700 employees. It also happens to be one of the few factories producing Michelin motorcycle tires worldwide.

A sizeable number of SME's are located in the area too. Important ones are Ingemar, cutters and polishers of marble and granite, Victorio Luzuriaga Usurbil in Txikierdi, a smelter. Both employ some 300 staff each.

== Administration ==
List of mayors
| 2007 | Xabier Mikel Errekondo (EAE-ANV) |
| 2003 | Luis María Ormaetxea (EA) |
| 1999 | José Antonio Altuna (EH) |
| 1995 | José Antonio Altuna (HB) |
| 1991 | José Antonio Altuna (HB) |
| 1987 | José Antonio Altuna (HB) |
| 1983 | Martín Larrañaga (EAJ-PNV) |
| 1979 | Andrés Bruño (EAJ-PNV) |

In Usurbil the Basque nationalist parties commonly attract between 75-80% of the votes. These are almost equally divided between the moderate nationalists and the leftist nationalists. After the restoration of democracy in Spain, the first two mayors belonged to the EAJ-PNV. When EA split away from the EAJ-PNV in 1986, the next three mayorships fell to Herri Batasuna (four, counting EH the successor party from HB) under Jose Antonio Altuna for 16 years. When Herri Batasuna was made illegal, Altuna could not stand for re-election in 2003 and Luis Maria Ormaetxea of EA became mayor.

In the last elections for the Basque Government in 2005, the Basque nationalist coalition PNV-EA won, taking 39.3% of the vote, followed by the independentist EHAK with 33.3%, PSE-EE/PSOE with 11%; the independentist Aralar with 6% and Partido Popular with 5.8%.

== Gastronomy ==
There are two gastronomical products that have given fame to Usurbil: glass eels and cider. Glass eels used to be common in most Basque rivers and in the Oria used to come upstream as far as Aginaga, whose inhabitants became expert angula fishers. Angulas de Aguinaga, made with oil and capsicum are famous throughout Spain. Glass eels have become rare as a result of pollution and have pushed up the price considerably.

Sagardoa (cider) is another important product and together with Astigarraga and Hernani, it is one of the main cider towns in Gipuzkoa. Cider production hit a low in the 1980s and of the three factories producing sparkling cider or sidra achampañada in the area, only one remains. From 1981 onwards, Usurbil pioneered the Sagardo Eguna (cider day), giving new impetus to the industry so successfully that other towns have taken up the idea. Today cider production is on the increase again and so the area still boasts many traditional and modern sagardotegiak.

== Sport ==
The main sport facility of the town is the Polideportivo Oiardo that was opened in 1990. This multi-purpose centre has capacities for 500 spectators, a covered swimming pool, squash courts, a gym and an outdoor football pitch. Most local sports clubs are based here, for example the Usurbil Kirol Elkartea (Usurbil Sports Club), the Judo Club Usurbil (Spanish) and karate clubs and Andatza KKE.

There is also a football stadium, Harane, owned by the city council. The Usurbil Futbol Taldea football team are based here.

More sporting facilities exist at the Ikastola Udarregi school which has a multi-purpose fronton and a concrete track. The Kontseju Zaharra fronton is located in the centre of Usurbil, next to the church. It is a covered fronton with additional tracks for the Basque rural sports. Aginaga and San Esteban-Urdaiaga also have covered pelota pitches. Zubieta has a fronton built for the joko-garbi variant of pelota which is very rare today in Gipuzkoa.

== Notable people ==
- Imanol Agirretxe (born 1987); footballer
- Andoni Iraola (born 1982), football player and current head coach of Liverpool F.C.
- Haimar Zubeldia (born 1977), cyclist
- Félix Mendizábal (1891–1959), sprinter
