= Buruntza =

Mountain in the Basque Country

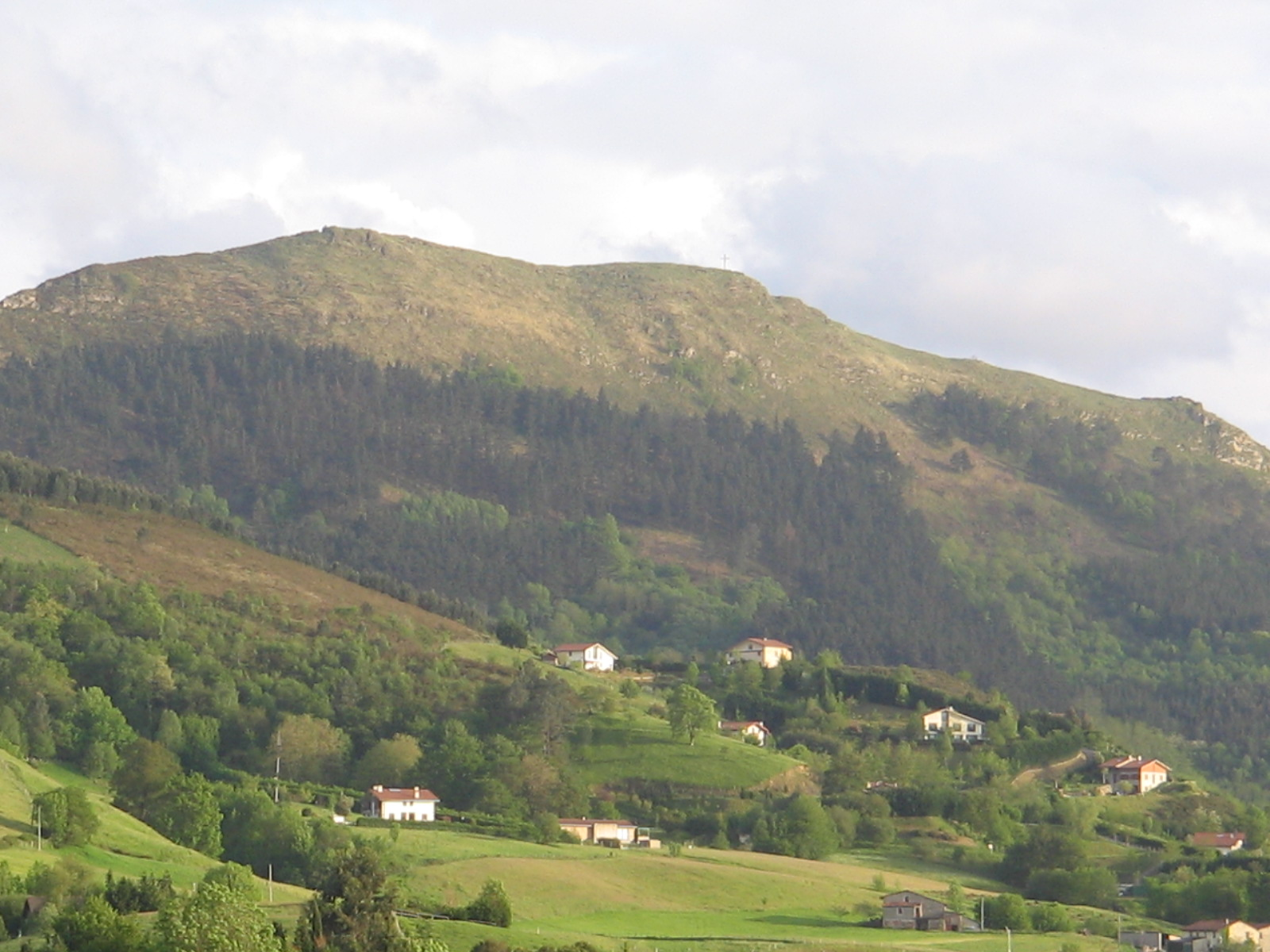
- Buruntza's north-west face

Highest point
- Elevation: 441 m (1,447 ft)
- Coordinates: 43°14′17.34″N 2°01′00.13″W

Naming
- Language of name: Basque
- Pronunciation: Basque: [buˈɾunts̻a]

Geography
- Location within Spain
- Location: Gipuzkoa, Spain

Climbing
- Easiest route: From Azkorte in Lasarte-Oria

Buruntza (441 m) is a minor mountain in the Basque Country (Spain) 12 km south of San Sebastian. Several towns lie at its foot, namely Andoain (S), Lasarte-Oria (N) and Urnieta (E). The mountain stretches out in a north-east to south-west disposition, starting at the pass of Azkorte (hermitage) on to a quarry at the southern end, by the neighbourhood Buruntza in Andoain. The mountain rises opposite to Adarra (E) and stands in turn to the east of the mountain Andatza (562 m). There is a big cross fixed at the summit.

The Oria River flows north along Buruntza's north-west face over a close valley run by the N-1 E-5 E-80 main road on both banks of the river. Actually, this tract was a race-car circuit between 1923 and 1935, its sinuous layout bearing witness to that origin. On the south-eastern side (Urnieta, Andoain), the outer reaches of the Urumea valley extend out south-east as a corridor, leaving the prominence of Buruntza towering right in the middle as a perfect vantage point over all the surroundings.

== Access points and trails ==
The main access point lies at the chapel Azkorte (210 m). A fence pass must be crossed to gradually gain height through a trail heading roughly south-east. The trail is well signposted. The access to the summit by the south-eastern face (Andoain) has been altered on account of the expansion of a quarry. A mud track departing from the quarry cuts across the north-eastern face at middle height, with the trail turning into a concrete road on its final stage sloping down to the fringes of the neighborhood Oria (Lasarte-Oria).

== Landscape and quarries ==
Buruntza is at the southernmost tip of a minor rigdeline where Urgonian limestone outcrops stand out at different spots all along. Geological features like this might have rendered all the area attractive to stone extraction, the mount being dotted all around with quarries widening ever more, in a way that even the current Azkorte hermitage shifted out of its former place to its present location of the Burundain pass on account of a stone extraction site being established (1973). Also, a second hermitage revered in Andoain, San Roke, stands not far from the edge of the southernmost quarry. As for vegetation, Monterey pine (Pinus radiata) for logging prevails, especially on the steep north-east face; willow trails behind in number. Incidentally, legend has it, mythological character Sanson hurled a stone against the people of Arano with a willow-made sling, but slipping on a dong the stone fell short, so originating the present-day ridge of Aballarri (meaning 'stone of the sling').

== Archeological findings and history ==
Buruntza holds a relevant archeological site on the slopes near the summit. It consists of an enclosed settlement of the Iron Age (first millennium BC), where remains of cereal (wheat, oats, barley) and leguminous plants (broad bean, pea) have been found, among other vestiges. This data have provided the basis for a newly released and breakthrough theory establishing the ancient boundaries between the Vascones and the Varduli at the east of the mount (in Leitzaran).

At the beginning of the Civil War (1936), a fiery battle between Republicans and Francoists took place in Buruntza. Republicans set up a defence-line, the mount being of strategical importance to keep in check Lasarte-Oria, Andoain and the communication lines between San Sebastian and Bilbao. Its slopes were heavily entrenched by Republicans, so it took three days of fighting to Francoist troops to take over the summit.

== Events ==
- At the beginning of May, the Holy Cross or Santa Kruzak festivity is held at the site of the Azkorte hermitage on a yearly basis. After the mass, punters of the event engage in traditional music, dance, snacks, drinking and eventually a popular meal.
