= Leitzaran =

River in Spain

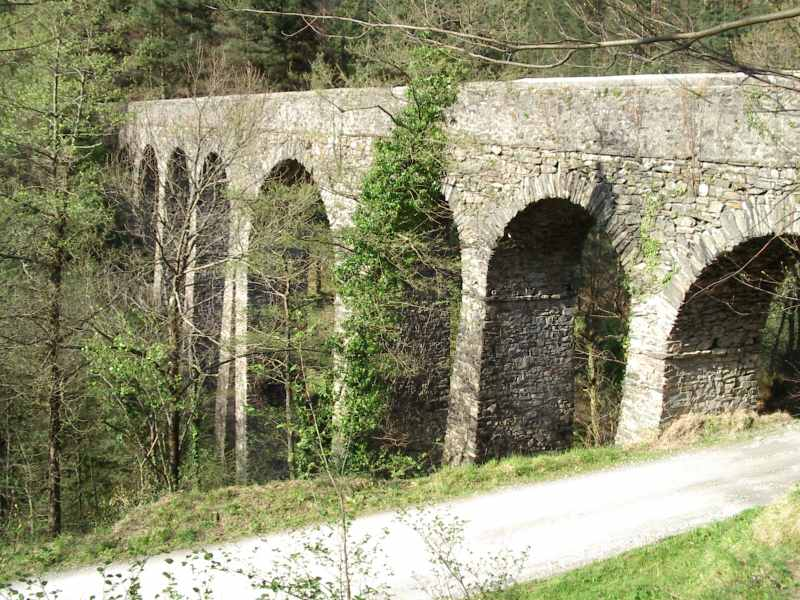
- Aqueduct over river Leitzaran in Ameraun

Location
- Country: Spain

Physical characteristics
- Source
  - location: Leitza
  - elevation: about 600 m (2,000 ft)
- Mouth
  - location: River Oria
  - elevation: 92 m (302 ft)
- Length: 42 km (26 mi)
- Basin size: 124.02 km^{2} (47.88 sq mi)
- Discharge
  - average: 2.88 m^{3}/s (102 cu ft/s)

The Leitzaran (pronounced [leiˈts̻aɾan], or Leizarán in Spanish) is a river and a valley in the Navarre and the Basque Country (Spain). It flows into the river Oria from its right.

Its source is in the Leitza municipality in Navarre, and it is 42 kilometres (26 mi) long. It enters into Gipuzkoa in a place called Urto. It takes water from the municipalities of Areso, Berastegi, Elduain, Villabona, Urnieta and Andoain and has an area of 124.02 square kilometres (47.88 mi^{2}), of which 69.72 square kilometres (26.92 mi^{2}) belongs to Gipuzkoa.

== Valle de Leizaran ==
The Gipuzkoan part of its basin is known as "Valle de Leizaran" (Leitzaran Valley, while "Leitzaran" means 'the Leitza valley' in Basque), and it mostly shapes up in the "Macizo de Cinco Villas", formed by materials formed in the Paleozoic (concretely in the Carboniferous), mostly slate and sandstone, fold during the Hercynian orogeny. The Leitzaran is very crooked and shows several meanders.

The gipuscoan Leitzaran is bounded in the east by the river Urumea’s valley, divided by the Adarra-Mandoegi mountain chain. Altzadi in this chain treads into the valley and separates the gipuscoan and the navarre Leitzaran. The dividing line in the west starts in Arizmendi and joins the Uzturre-Ipuliño chain later, in Belabieta. This mountains separates the valley from Zelai and Elduain, as well as the small valleys in the area of Amasa-Villabona.

== Protected biotope ==
The shorelines of the Leitzaran and those of its tributaries Ubaran (Ubane) and Malo were declared Protected Biotopes on 29 September 1995. They have a total area of 0.74 square kilometres (0.29 mi^{2}). Despite its apparently dehumanised appearance, the trace of man is strong. There are plenty of prehistoric monuments (especially in its borders) and grazing has been long-practised (as shown by the "seles" presence).

== Industry ==
The most significant industry was the blast furnaces and the river was very useful to them. Minerals came from the valley itself, but there were also some imported from Somorrostro. The river's waters have powered flour watermills and small hydroelectric power stations as well, some of them still functioning.

=== Bizkotx mines and railway ===
In order to carry the minerals from the Bizkotx mines a railway was built from the mines (located near the place known as Plazaola) to Andoain. Afterwards, its two ends were lengthened to Pamplona and to Lasarte, a place where it joined up to the Ferrocarriles Vascongados (Basque Railways), where it could provide services to Donostia (San Sebastián). This railway (Pamplona - San Sebastián or PSS) was popularly called "Tren del Plazaola" (Plazaola's Train in Spanish) and "Tren-txiki" (Little Train in Basque).

== Greenway ==
A big part of the Plazaola railway's course is being recovered for leisure as a greenway.

== See also ==
- List of rivers of Spain
