= Oiartzualdea =

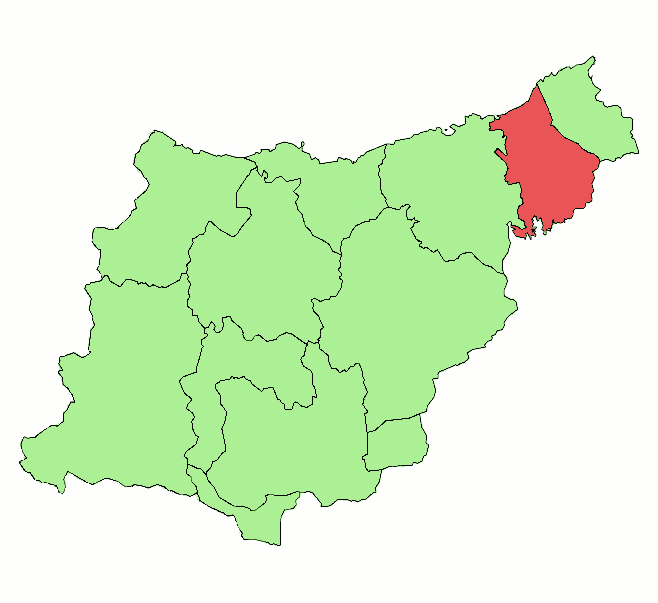
Map of Oiartzualdea

Oiartzualdea in Basque (Oarsoaldea in Spanish) is a subcomarca of Donostialdea in Gipuzkoa, formed by four municipalities, Errenteria being the main town.

== Municipalities ==
Basque Name (Official)	Spanish Name	Population 2001 Census	Population 2011 Census	Population 2018 Estimate
Errenteria	Rentería	38,224	39,228	39,355
Lezo		5,834	6,011	6,045
Oiartzun	Oyarzun	9,179	10,012	10,276
Pasaia	Pasajes	15,962	15,727	16,128
Totals		69,199	70,978	71,804
