= Oria (river) =

River in Spain

Coordinates: 43°17′25″N 2°07′55″W

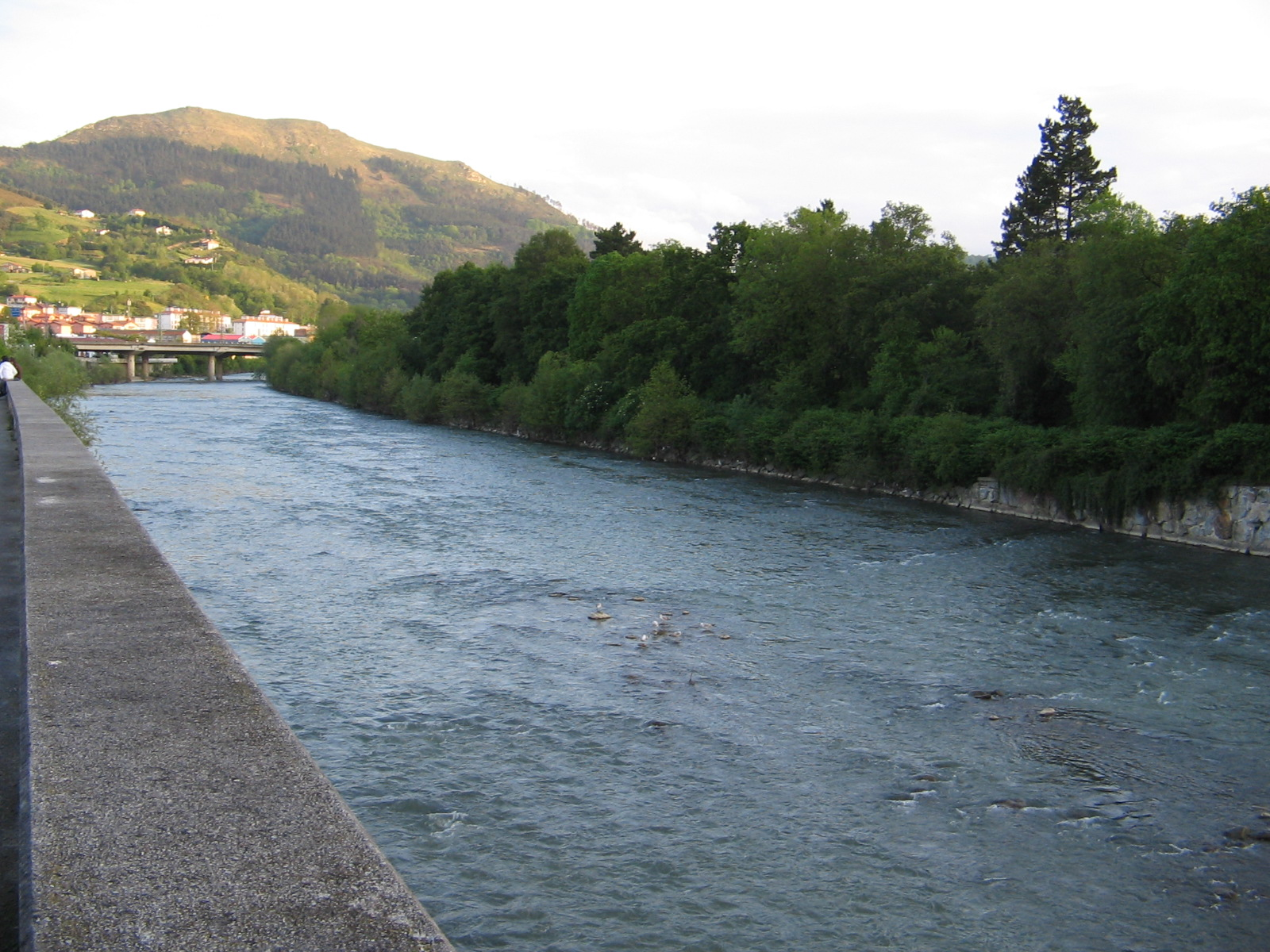
- The Oria river on its way through Lasarte-Oria with mount Buruntza in the background

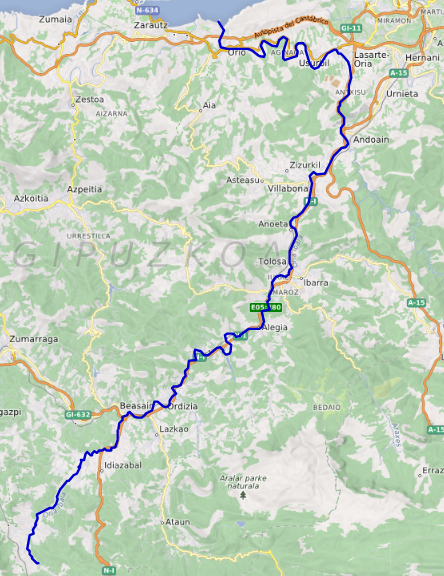

Location
- Country: Spain

Physical characteristics
- Source
  - location: Basque Mountains
- Mouth
  - location: Cantabrian Sea (Bay of Biscay)
- Length: 75 km (47 mi)
- Basin size: 882.5 km^{2} (340.7 sq mi)
- Discharge
  - average: 25.6 m^{3}/s (900 cu ft/s)

The Oria [ˈoɾja] is a river in the Basque Country at the north of the Iberian Peninsula. It's one of a series of Basque rivers flowing into the Bay of Biscay (Atlantic basin) and the main river of the province Gipuzkoa in volume (25.6 m^{3}/s), length (75 km) and basin (882.5 km^{2}), the main feature of these rivers aligned south to north being their shortness. The maximum elevation at the source is 1,260 m, while at its lowest height the tidal influence extends inland up to Usurbil (estuary). On this final stretch, many marsh and wetland strips dotted the banks of the Oria, although some of them have been drained for agricultural and building purposes.

The river rises at the south of the municipality of Zegama near the hamlet of Otzaurte and the San Adrian tunnel, harvesting the waters of the north-eastern side of the mountain range Aizkorri, so the river results from the merging of several streams. The first town it crosses is the very nucleus of Zegama, with other major towns of Gipuzkoa being located on the river, e.g. Beasain, Ordizia, Tolosa, Andoain, Lasarte-Oria, Usurbil and finally Orio at the mouth. From Lasarte-Oria to Orio, the sinuous and traffic laden coastal road N-634 winds along.

The Oria is a central river and an important axis for the province of Gipuzkoa. The major road A-1 (European route E-5 E-80) runs along the Oria most of the time, as well as the Spanish Northern Railway, right from its rise on the slopes of Aizkorri. Its watershed holds a population of 128,000 inhabitants, most of the lowland being heavily inhabited, while the area of its southernmost stretch is sparsely populated.

== Environmental condition and fauna ==
The banks of the river were intensely industrialized starting in the middle of the 19th century and later; the river grew conspicuously polluted up to the 1980s, with almost all its river fauna becoming extinct. At that point, its environmental situation began to revert, the river showing currently a healthy condition. There exists an unstable trout population downstream of Andoain, while other fish prevail and remain steady, i.e. Cyprinidae such as barbel (Barbus graellsi), ezkailu (Phoxinus phoxinus) and ray-finned fish (Chondrostoma toxostoma arrigonis). A stretch of the estuary by the village Aginaga is known for its baby eels, bred and harvested for human consumption before they grow up, providing for a much appreciated and dearly paid delicacy, while they were totally neglected just some decades ago.

== Main tributaries ==
There are several streams and small rivers flowing into the Oria. The main tributaries are Leitzaran in Andoain and Araxes in Tolosa.
