= Joseba Arregui Aramburu =

Spanish theologian, academic, and politician (1946–2021)

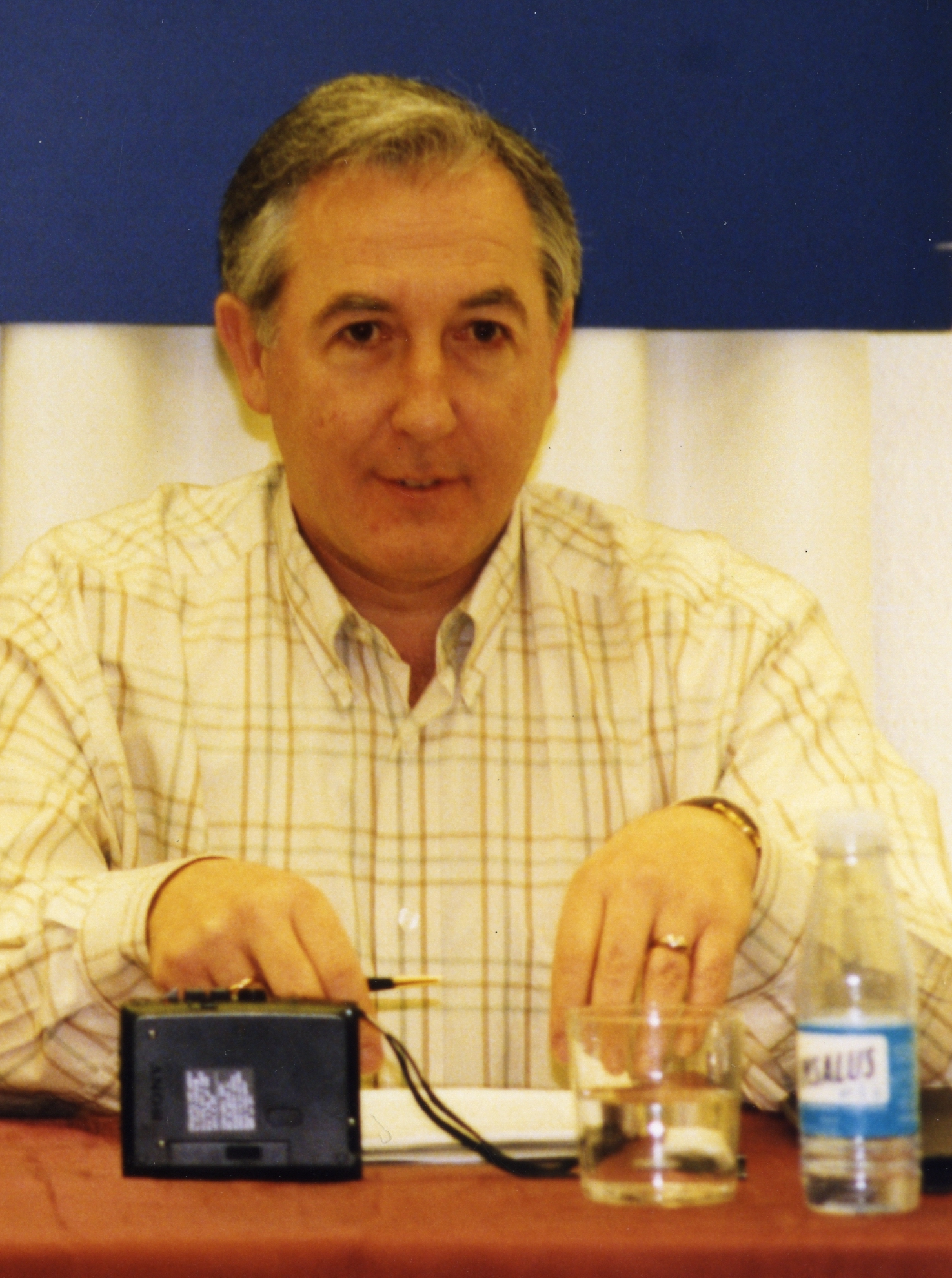
- Aramburu in 1996

Minister of Culture of the Basque Government
- In office 16 April 1984 – 2 March 1985
- President: José Antonio Ardanza
- Preceded by: Pedro Miguel Etxenike
- Succeeded by: Luis María Bandrés
- In office 4 October 1991 – 4 January 1995
- President: José Antonio Ardanza
- Preceded by: position re-established
- Succeeded by: Maria del Carmen Garmendia

Minister of Culture and Tourism of the Basque Government
- President: José Antonio Ardanza
- Preceded by: Luis Maria Bandrés
- Succeeded by: position abolished

Member of the Basque Parliament
- In office 1999–2001
- Constituency: Gipuzkoa

Personal details
- Born: 30 May 1946 Andoain, Spain
- Died: 14 September 2021 (aged 75) Bilbao, Spain
- Party: EAJ

Joseba Arregui Aramburu (30 May 1946 – 14 September 2021) was a Spanish politician, theologian, and academic.

== Biography ==
Arregui was born in Andoain on 30 May 1946. He studied at the Seminario Diocesano de San Sebastián and was ordained a priest. He then travelled to Fribourg to study theology and teaching and later earned a doctorate in theology from the University of Münster. He returned to Spain and finished his studies, earning a doctorate in sociology from the University of Deusto. He became a professor of sociology at the University of the Basque Country until his retirement in 2011.

Arregui became a prominent member of the Basque Nationalist Party (EAJ) and resistant to the Franco dictatorship. He served as Minister of Culture of the Basque Government multiple times under the leadership of José Antonio Ardanza and was a member of the Basque Parliament from 1999 to 2001, representing Gipuzkoa. He also served on the Euzkadi Buru Batzar. He retired from political activity in 2001 and left the EAJ in 2004 due to disagreements within the party. That year, he co-founded "Aldaketa", which promoted political change in the Basque Country and defended the Statute of Autonomy of the Basque Country of 1979.

Arrregui was the author of multiple books, such as La nación vasca posible, Euskadi invertebrada, and El terror de ETA: la narrativa de las víctimas.

Joseba Arregui Aramburu died on 14 September 2021 at the age of 75.
