= Leitzaldea =

Coordinates: 43°4′25″N 1°55′22″W

- Eskualdea / Comarca
- Country: Spain
- Autonomous community: Navarre
- Municipalities: List: See text

Population (mid 2019)
  - Total: 7,377
- Time zone: UTC+1 (CET)
  - Summer (DST): UTC+2 (CEST)

Leitzaldea (Spanish: Norte de Aralar) is a comarca in Navarre, Spain.

== Municipalities ==
The comarca consists of eight municipalities, with the largest being the municipality of Leitza. They are listed below with their populations at recent censuses, together with the most recent official estimate:

Name	Population Census 2001	Population Census 2011	Population Estimate 2019
Araitz	587	572	512
Arano	134	121	116
Areso	284	276	279
Betelu	334	351	366
Goizueta	886	759	704
Larraun	985	1,012	951
Leitza	2,912	2,925	2,913
Lekunberri	873	1,437	1,536
Totals	6,995	7,453	7,377

The municipalities of Arano and Goizueta lie in the north of the comarca, at a distance from the rest of the municipalities.

== See also ==
- Category:People from Norte de Aralar
