= Juan de Urbieta =

Spanish infantryman

Juan de Urbieta Berástegui y Lezo (Hernani, ? - died, 22 August 1553) was a Spanish infantryman who became famous when he captured king Francis I of France near the end of the Battle of Pavia on 24 February 1525.

== Capture of King Francis I ==
Surrounded by imperial troops, the king of France and his escort, who were fighting on foot at that time, tried to break through the enemy, but Francis' horse was killed before he could complete the maneuver, and when he was able to get on his feet again, there was a sword pointing at his neck. It was Juan de Urbieta's sword. The Basque soldier, together with Diego Dávila & Alonso Pita da Veiga, accepted his surrender. They didn't know who their captive was, but due to his expensive clothes and armour they supposed he would be a great noble. They were shocked when, in handing him to their officers, they were informed that they had captured the king of France.

== Consequences ==
Urbieta obtained fame & honours due to this action. Emperor Charles granted him a coat-of-arms and issued him a document certifying his merits. He was promoted to cavalry officer and obtained the titles of knight of Santiago & "Contino de Su Majestad". Also, Francis I of France wrote him a letter thanking him for accepting his surrender in the course of the battle, letting him stay alive.

He died on 22 August 1553 in Hernani, the same place in which he was born, and he was buried inside the church of Saint John the Baptist, as he asked in his testament. His remains were desecrated by French soldiers during the Peninsular War.
