= Elduain =

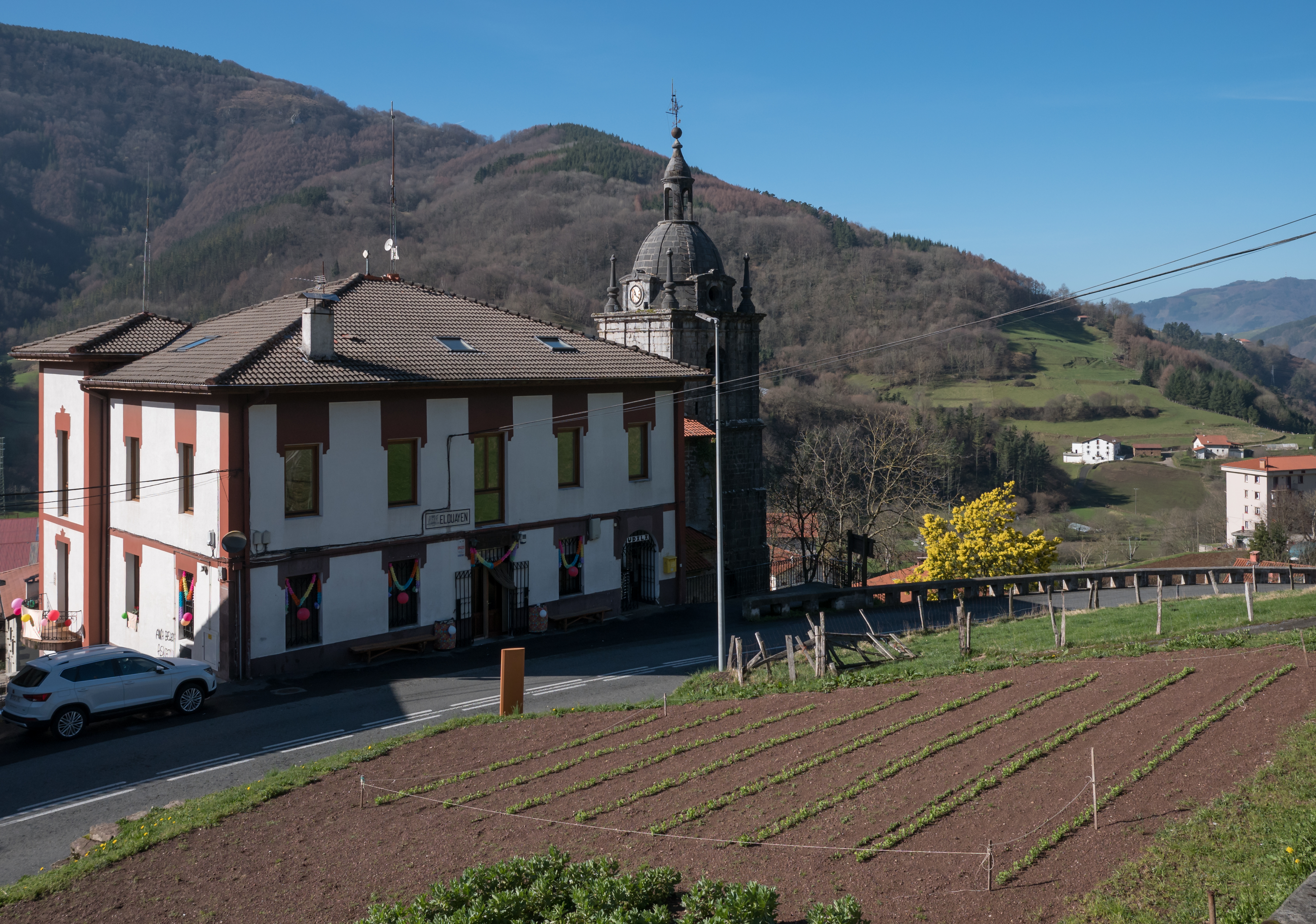
- Elduain Local Council

- Location of Elduain within the Basque Country
- Coordinates: 43°8′26″N 2°0′3″W
- Country: Spain
- Autonomous community: Gipuzkoa

Area
  - Total: 25.07 km^{2} (9.68 sq mi)

Population (2025-01-01)
  - Total: 248
  - Density: 9.89/km^{2} (25.6/sq mi)
- Time zone: UTC+1 (CET)
  - Summer (DST): UTC+2 (CEST)
- Website: www.elduain.eus

Elduain is a village in the province of Gipuzkoa, in the autonomous community of the Basque Country, northern Spain. It is situated in the Leitzaran valley, some 32 km south of San Sebastián. The municipality has a population of 239 (2014) and covers an area of 25 km². It was founded in 1614.
