= Andoain =

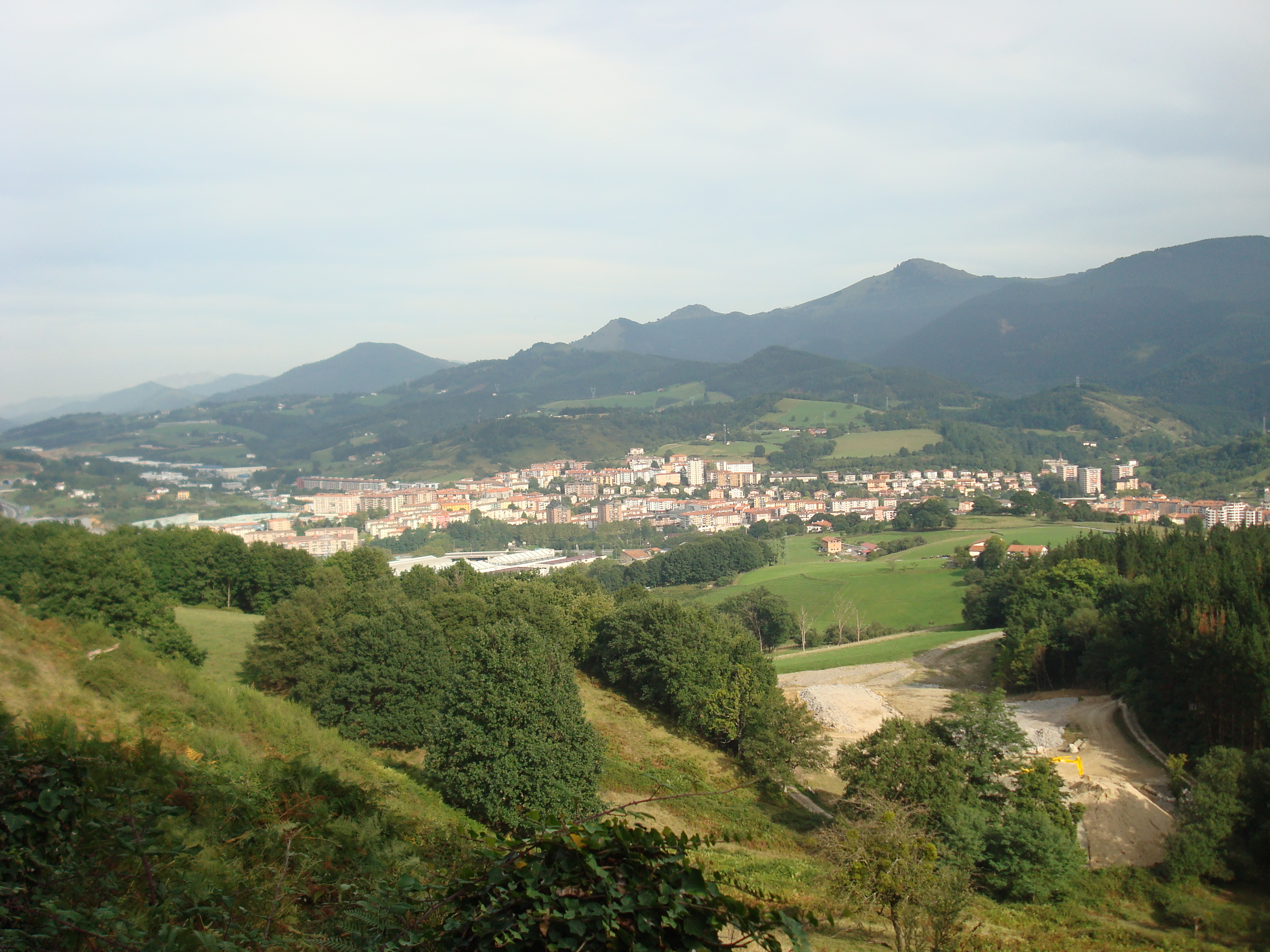

- Coat of arms

- Location of Andoain within the Basque Country
- Coordinates: 43°13′N 2°01′W
- Country: Spain
- Autonomous community: Gipuzkoa

Government
  - Mayor: Andoni Alvarez Lete

Area
  - Total: 27.4 km^{2} (10.6 sq mi)
- Elevation: 65 m (213 ft)

Population (2025-01-01)
  - Total: 14,517
  - Density: 530/km^{2} (1,370/sq mi)
- Time zone: UTC+1 (CET)
  - Summer (DST): UTC+2 (CEST)
- Website: www.andoain.eus

Andoain is a town in the province of Gipuzkoa, in the autonomous community of Basque Country, in the North of Spain. Nowadays it has a population of 14,637 inhabitants (2019), which has been quite stable since the 90s.

Andoain is located where the Oria River meets the Leitzaran river, next to the mountains Belkoain and Buruntza. Andoain is recognized by its green areas surrounding the rivers, which are dense forests, very suitable for hiking and biking (Leizaran Valley).

== Geography ==
Andoain is situated in the Oria valley, closer to Belkoain mountain. The town is surrounded by several mountains: Buruntza (439 m), Belkoain (488 m), Aizkorri (598 m), Usobelartza (647 m) and Adarra (817 m) and the oria river goes throw the city center.

=== Climate ===
Andoain experiences an oceanic climate (Köppen climate classification Cfb) with abundant rains during the whole year, and moderate temperature, without extreme hot nor cold. Average annual rain reaches 1700 mm and mean temperature is 14 C.

== Demography ==
demographic vertical bar chart of between 1900 and 2019

== Governance ==
Current town mayor is Andoni Alvarez Lete from EH Bildu.

List of mayors
2023	Andoni Alvarez Lete (EH Bildu)
2019	Maider Lainez Lazcoz (PSE-EE (PSOE))
2015	Ana María Karrere Zabala (EH Bildu)
2011	Ana María Karrere Zabala (Bildu)
2009	Estanislao Amutxastegi Arregi (PSE-EE (PSOE))
2007	José Antonio Pérez Gabarain (PSE-EE (PSOE))
2003	José Antonio Pérez Gabarain (PSE-EE (PSOE))
1999	José Antonio Barandiaran Ezama (Euskal Herritarrok)
1995	José Antonio Pérez Gabarain (PSE-EE (PSOE))
1991	M.ª Pilar Collantes Ibáñez (PSE-PSOE)
1987	Carlos Sanz Díez de Uré (Euskadiko Ezkerra)
1983	Patxi Irigoras Etxebeste (EAJ-PNV)
1979	José Antonio Pérez Gabarain (Euskadiko Ezkerra)

== See also ==
- Battle of Andoain
- Joseba Arregui Aramburu
- Roberto Cabrejas
