= Astigarraga =

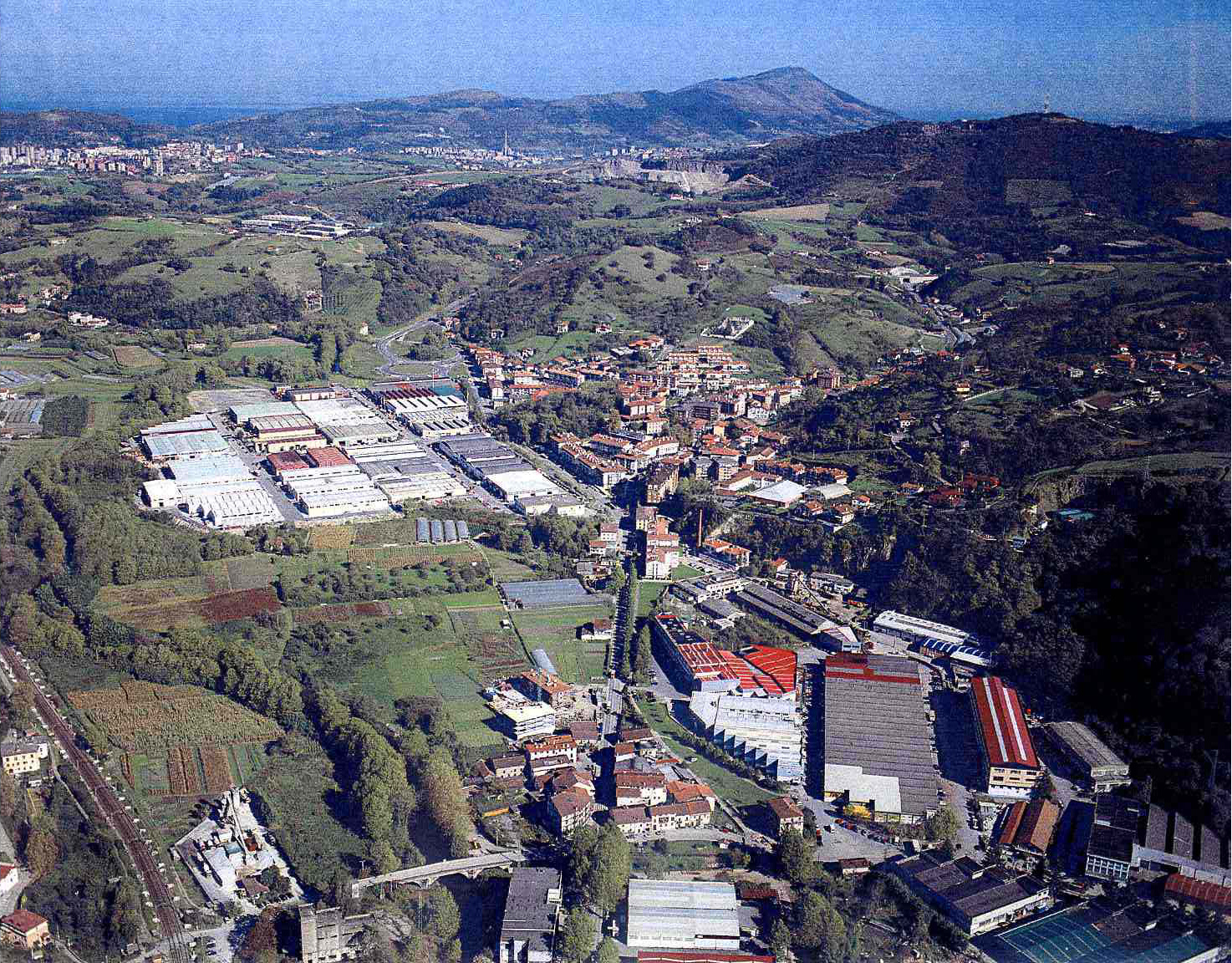
- View of Astigarraga

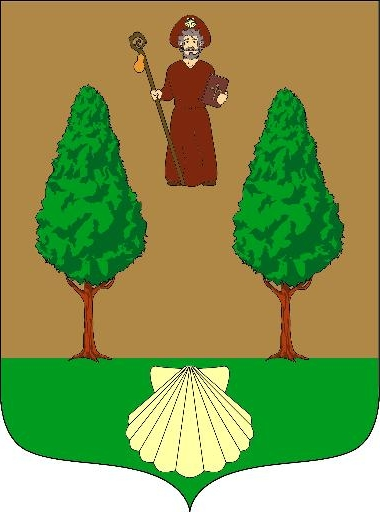
- Coat of arms

- Location of Astigarraga within the Basque Country Astigarraga (Spain)
- Coordinates: 43°17′N 1°57′W
- Country: Spain
- Autonomous community: Gipuzkoa

Government
  - Mayor: Zorione Etxezarreta Ortuondo

Area
  - Total: 12 km^{2} (4.6 sq mi)
- Elevation: 25 m (82 ft)

Population (2025-01-01)
  - Total: 7,812
  - Density: 650/km^{2} (1,700/sq mi)
- Time zone: UTC+1 (CET)
  - Summer (DST): UTC+2 (CEST)
- Postal code: 20115
- Website: astigarraga.eus/es

Astigarraga is a town located in the province of Gipuzkoa, in the Autonomous Community of Basque Country, in northern Spain.
