= Urumea =

Coordinates: 43°19′34″N 1°58′56″W

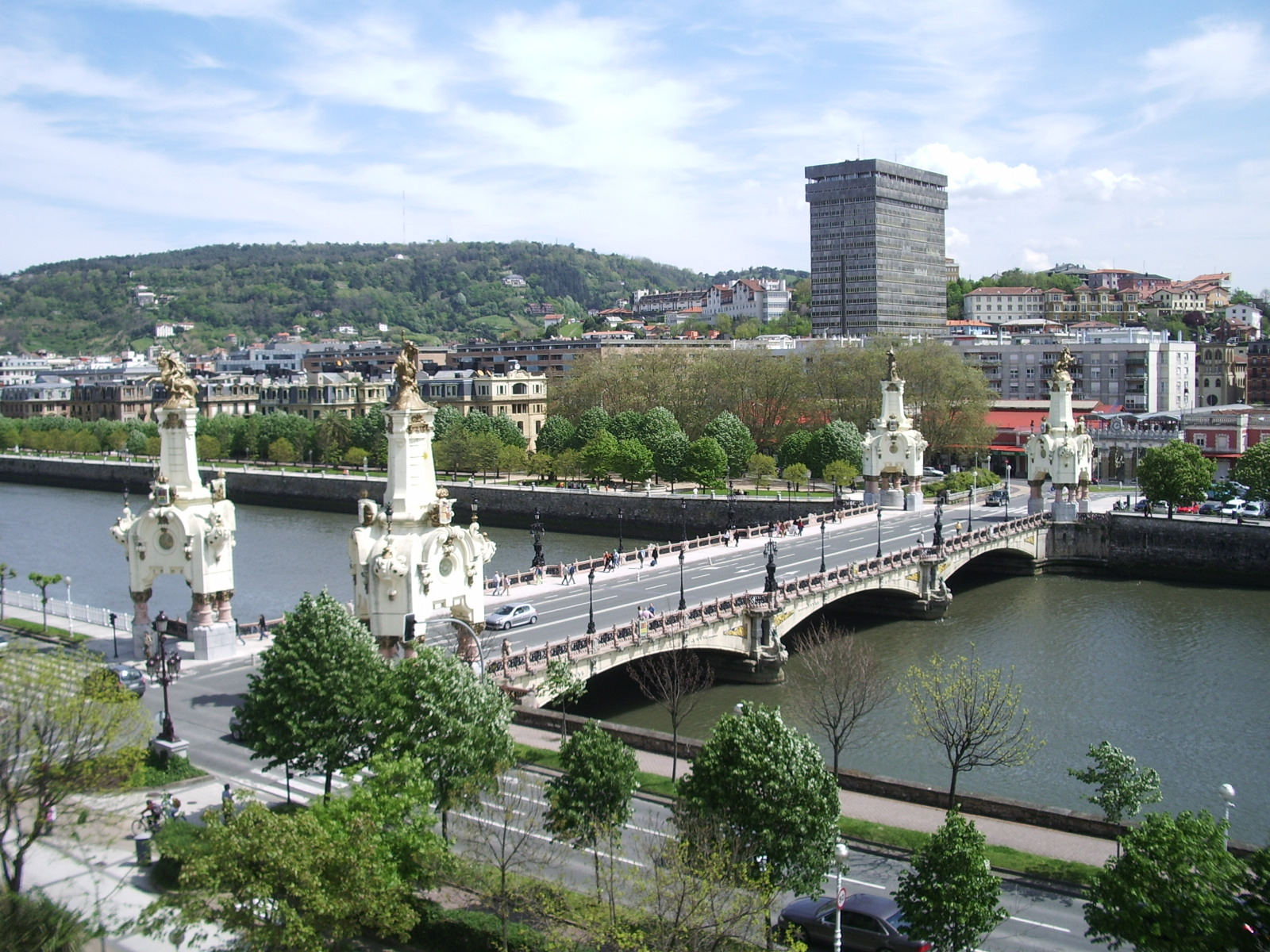
- The Urumea at San Sebastián

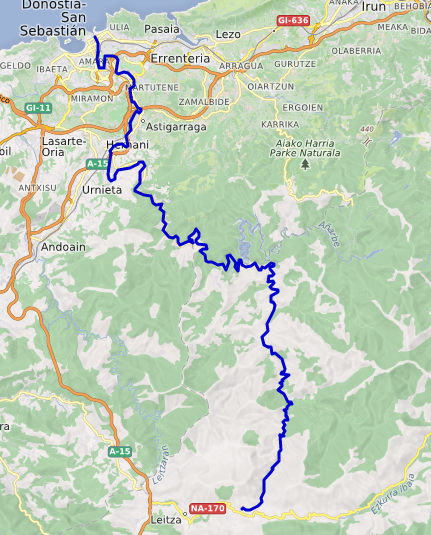

Location
- Country: Spain

Physical characteristics
- Source
  - location: Basque Mountains
  - elevation: 1,136 m (3,727 ft)
- Mouth
  - location: Cantabrian Sea (Bay of Biscay)
- Length: 59.4 km (36.9 mi)
- Basin size: 279 km^{2} (108 sq mi)
- Discharge
  - average: 13.63 m^{3}/s (481 cu ft/s)

The Urumea (Basque: [uˈɾumea] or [uɾuˈmea], stemming from Basque ur 'water' + me(he)a 'thin') is a river in the Basque Country at the north of the Iberian Peninsula. It is one of a series of Basque rivers flowing into the Bay of Biscay (Atlantic basin) and is best known for being the river flowing towards the sea by the city of San Sebastián.

== Course of the river and water data ==
The river is 59.4 km long from its source in the Navarrese municipality of Goizueta, and 33 km of it runs through the province of Gipuzkoa. The average temperature is 13.5 °C (56.3 °F). The seasonal and year-to-year variations in water flow are less marked than in other basins of Gipuzkoa, and the natural regulation of this basin is very high.

The quality of the water is fairly good, despite a slight deterioration downstream near the mouth (moderately good condition) where the city of San Sebastián lies. However, lately, works have been done on the treatment and cleaning of water resulting in an outstanding environmental recovery.

=== Upstream river waves ===
The mouth of the Urumea river is known for its upstream river wave, which attracts river surfers. The phenomenon looks similar to tidal bores, but it's caused by ocean swells instead of tides. Similar to tidal bores, the waves form in the ocean and travel up the river.

== Fauna ==
The current water quality allows for a stable fish fauna with five species populating the river, namely salmon (extinct in 1940 and restored thanks to the re-population programs of the 1980s), trout, common minnow, loach and eel.

== Basin ==
The lower stretch of the river has wide and flat banks fit for crops and urban development, which has resulted in the most inhabited drainage basin in Gipuzkoa, with 212,564 inhabitants. The main towns on the river are Hernani with its first industrial estates located upstream on its banks (paper and chemical industry, an aluminium mill, lift manufacturing, etc.); Astigarraga, renowned for its cider houses; and San Sebastián with a final long stretch of the river snaking through different parts of the town. The main focus of cider houses concentrates on a strip along the left bank in Hernani and on a minor road sloping up from the right bank at the limit between Astigarraga and the outer lands of San Sebastián.

== Gallery ==
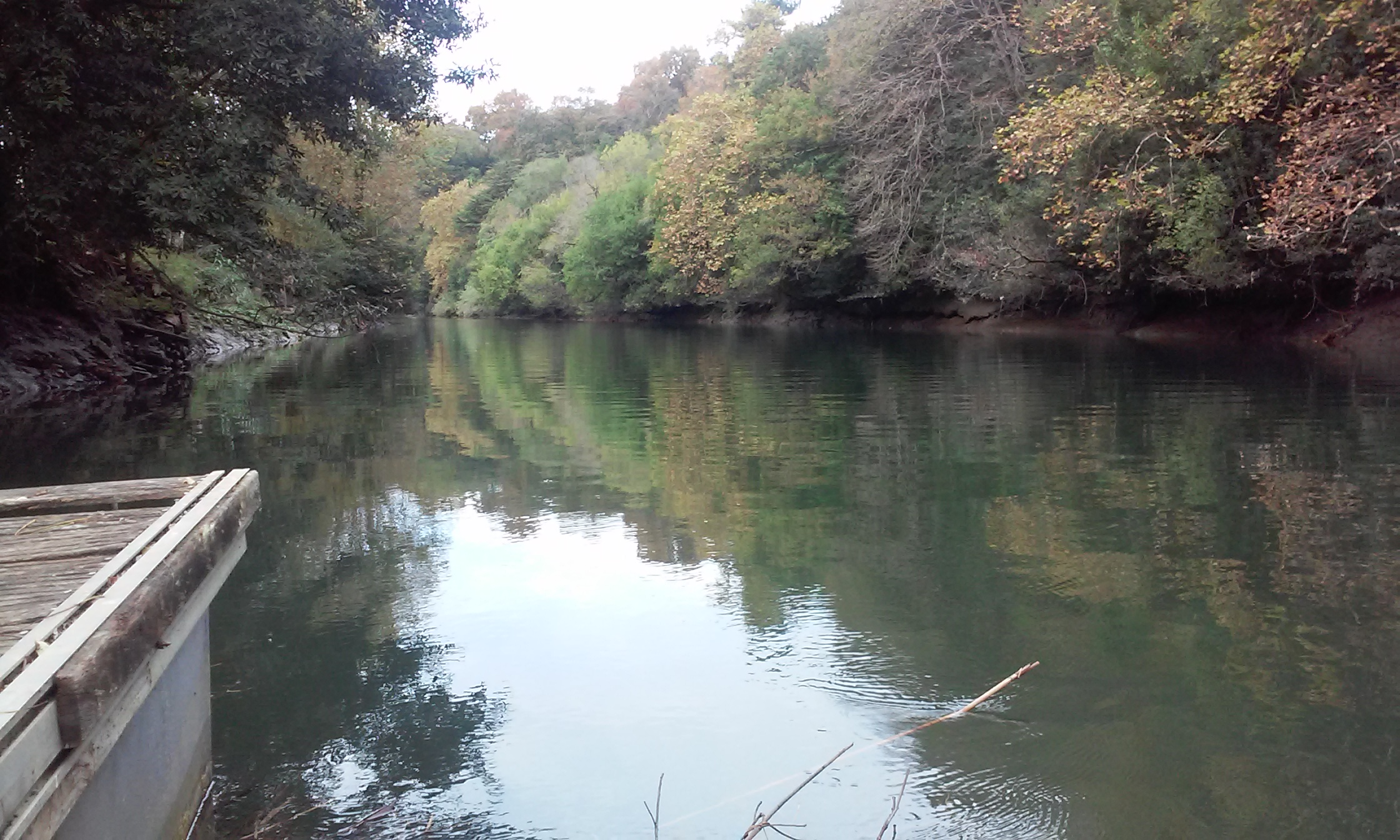
The Urumea near Loyola

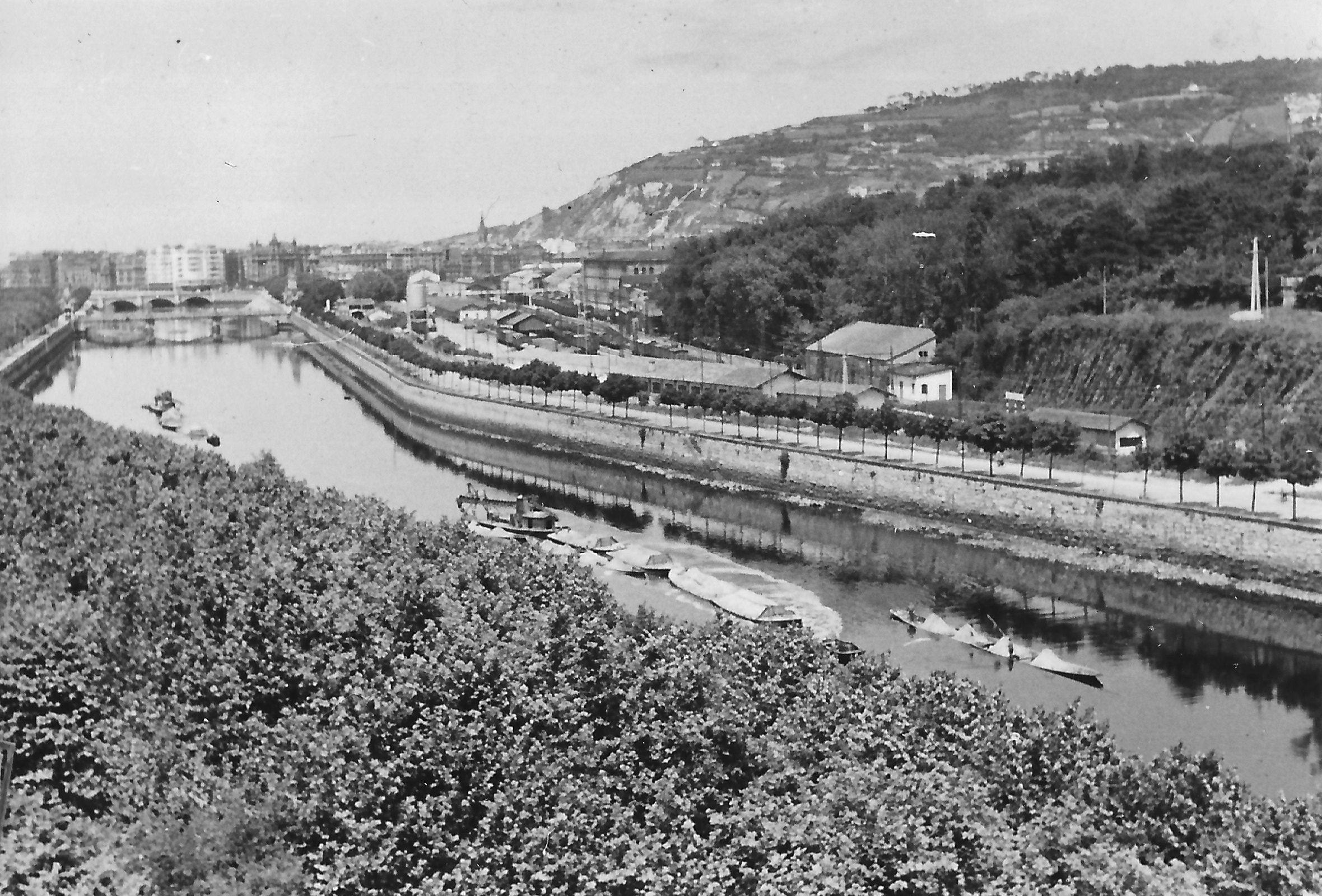
The river in 1961

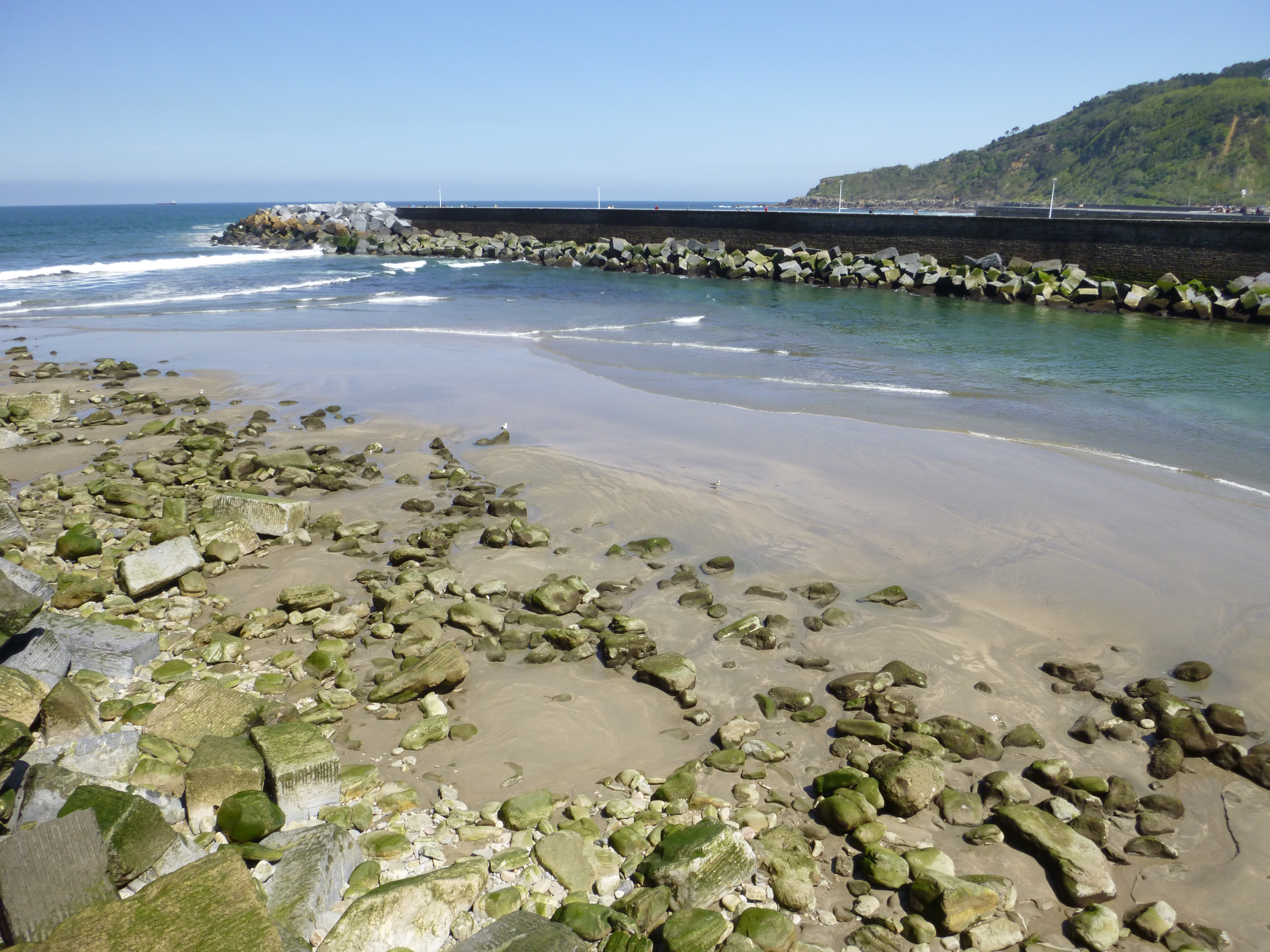
Mouth of Urumea

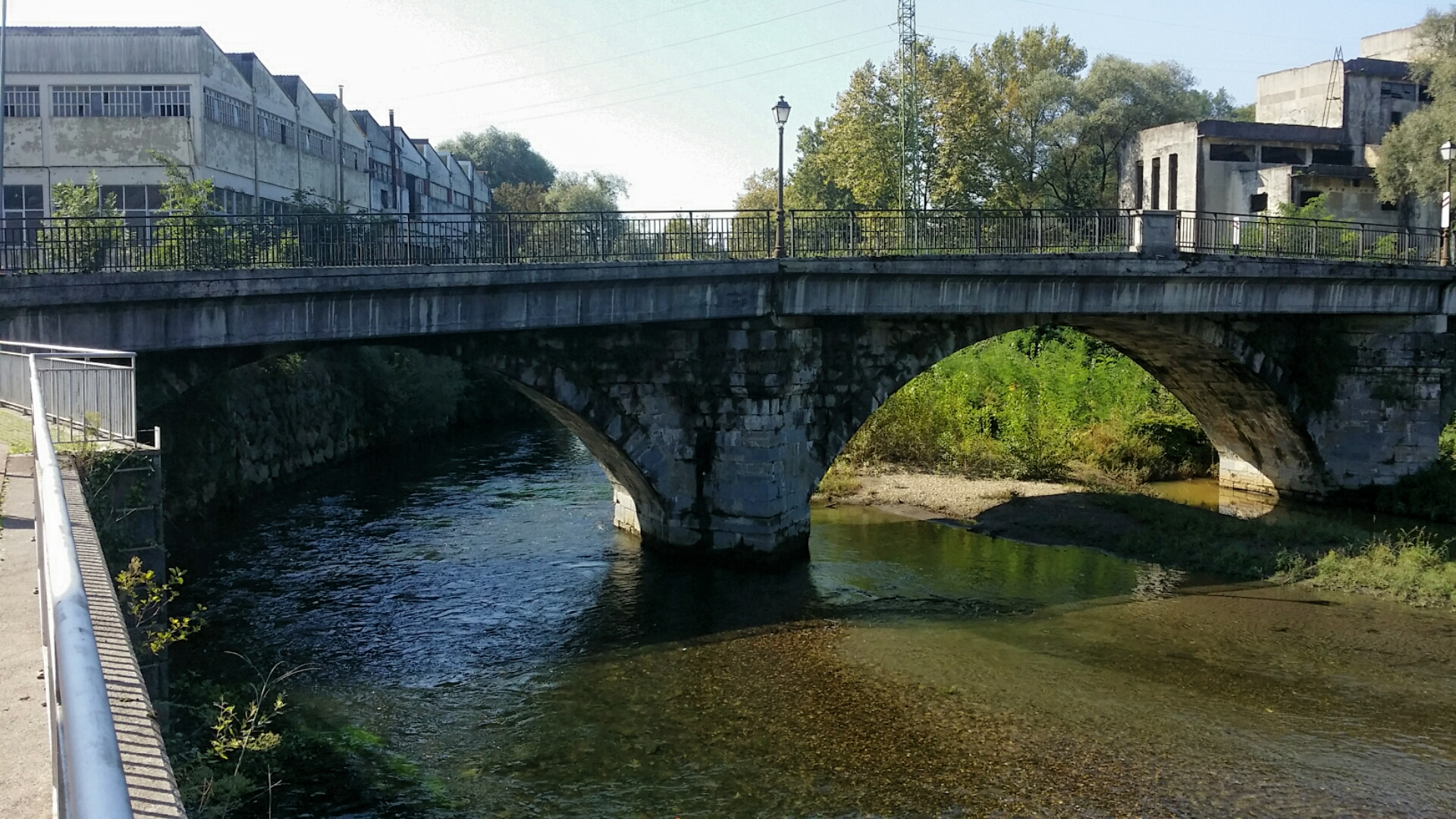
Bridge over Urumea at Ergobi

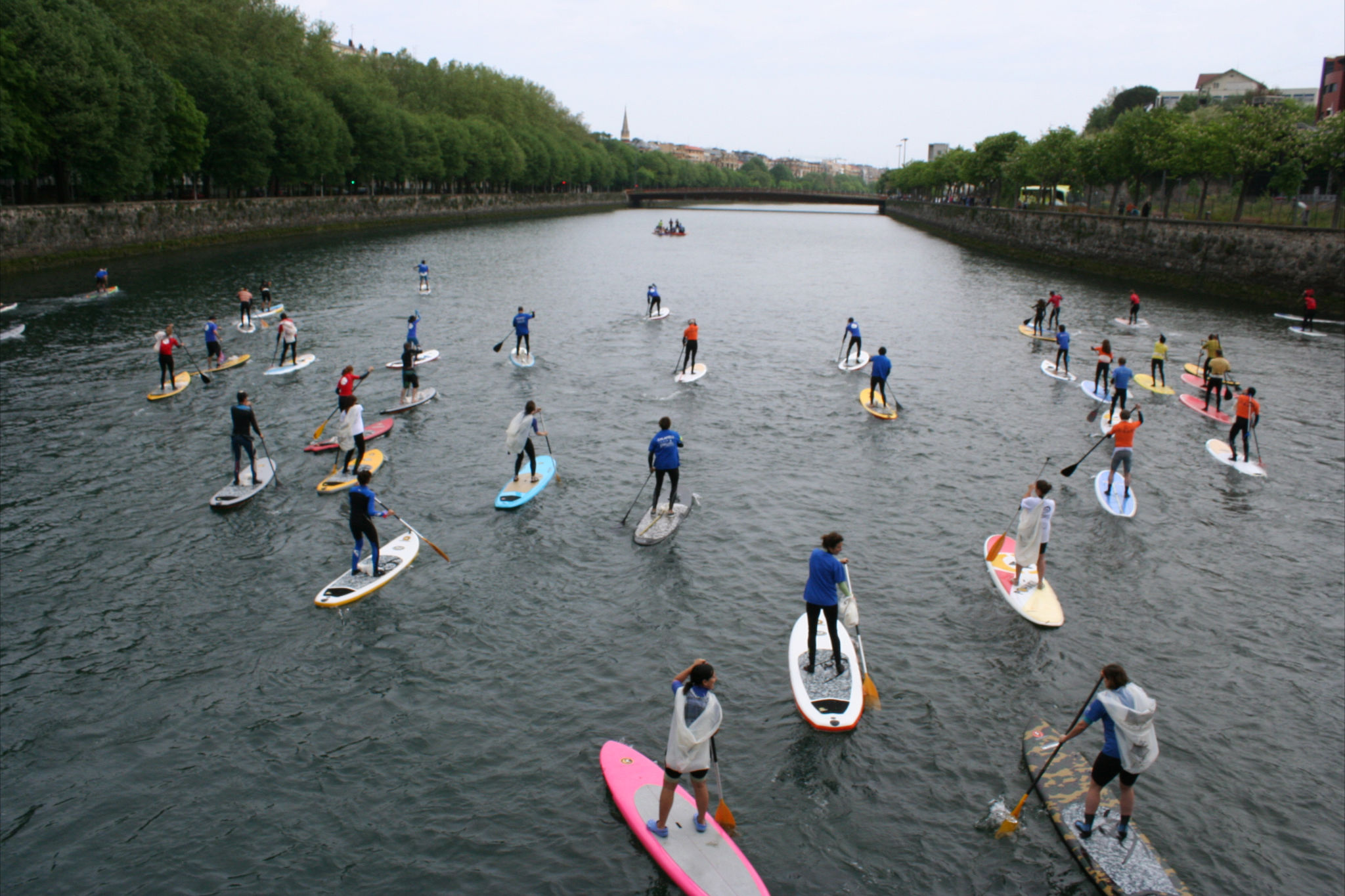
River in San Sebastián

== See also ==
- List of rivers of Spain
