= Lasarte-Oria =

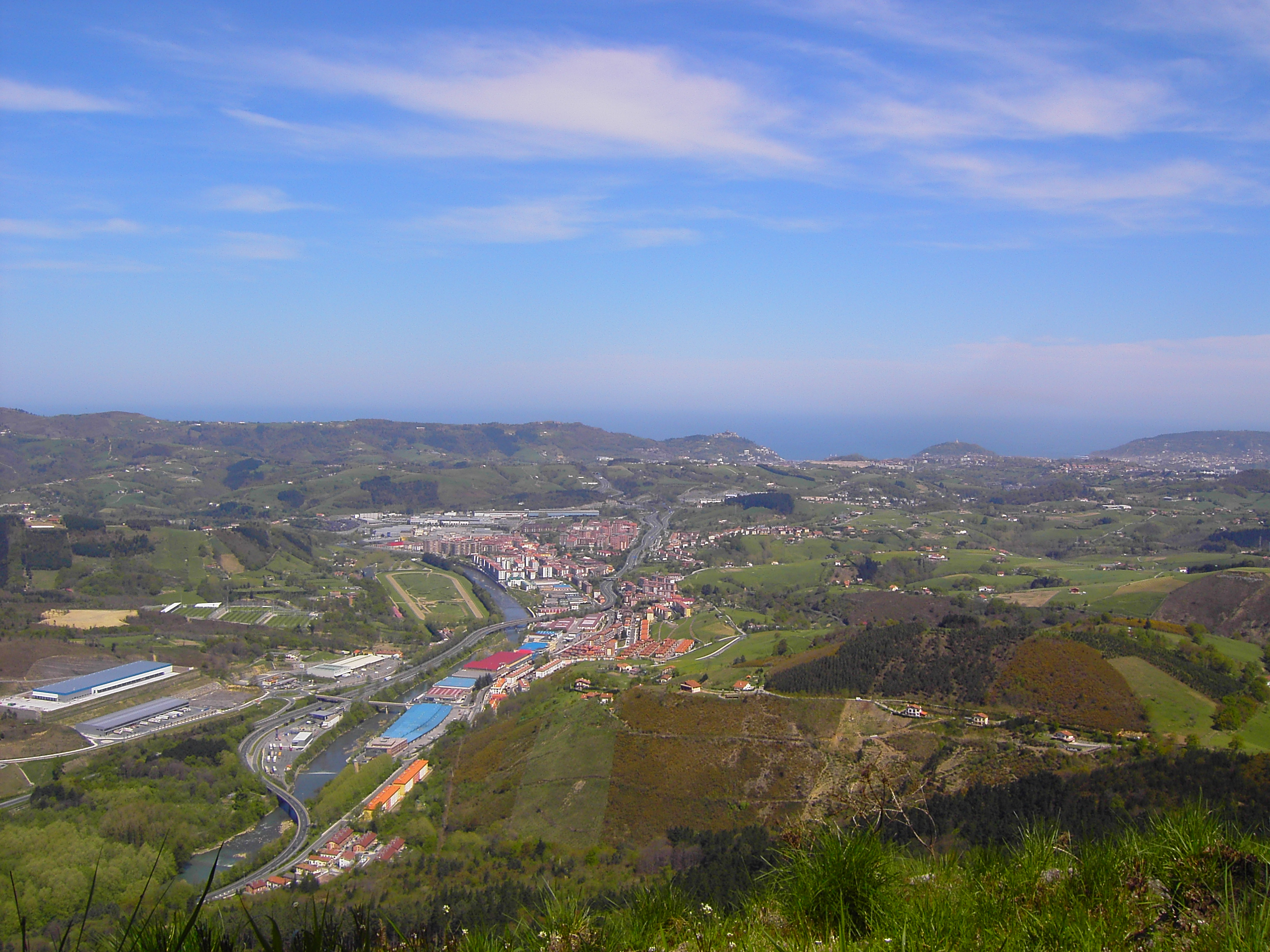
- View of the town from the south (at Buruntza mountain)

- Coat of arms

- Location in Spain
- Coordinates: 43°16′04″N 2°01′12″W
- Country: Spain
- Autonomous community: Basque Country

Area
  - Total: 601 km^{2} (232 sq mi)

Population (2025-01-01)
  - Total: 19,435
  - Density: 32.3/km^{2} (83.8/sq mi)
- Time zone: UTC+1 (CET)
  - Summer (DST): UTC+2 (CEST)
- Website: www.lasarte-oria.eus

Lasarte-Oria is a town located in the province of Gipuzkoa, in the Autonomous Community of Basque Country, northern Spain. It was founded in 1986. It is estimated to have a population of around 19,000 people inhabitants.
