= Urnieta =

- Municipality
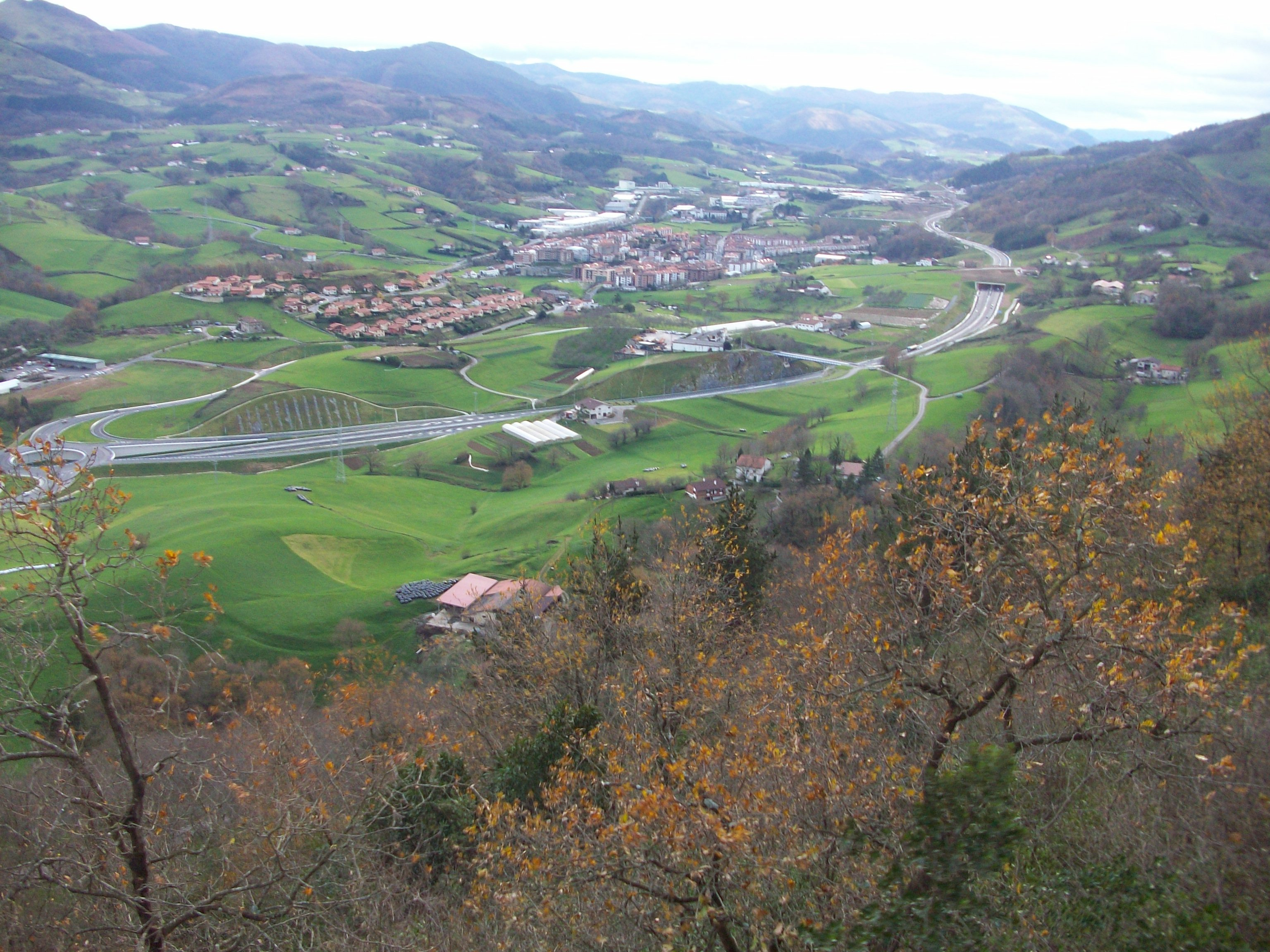

- Coat of arms

- Location of Urnieta within the Basque Country Urnieta (Spain)
- Coordinates: 43°14′49″N 1°59′30″W
- Country: Spain
- Autonomous community: Basque Country
- Province: Gipuzkoa
- Comarca: Donostialdea

Government
  - Mayor: Mikel Pagola Tolosa (EAJ-PNV)

Area
  - Total: 22.4 km^{2} (8.6 sq mi)

Population (2025-01-01)
  - Total: 6,327
  - Density: 282/km^{2} (732/sq mi)
- Demonym: Basque: Urnietarra
- Time zone: UTC+1 (CET)
  - Summer (DST): UTC+2 (CEST)
- Postal code: 20130

Urnieta is a town located in the province of Gipuzkoa, in the Autonomous Community of Basque Country, northern Spain.

It is known for its Sagardotegi, restaurants that specialise in cider and regional food.
