= Arano, Navarre =

Village and municipality in Spain

Coordinates: 43°11′59″N 1°53′43″W

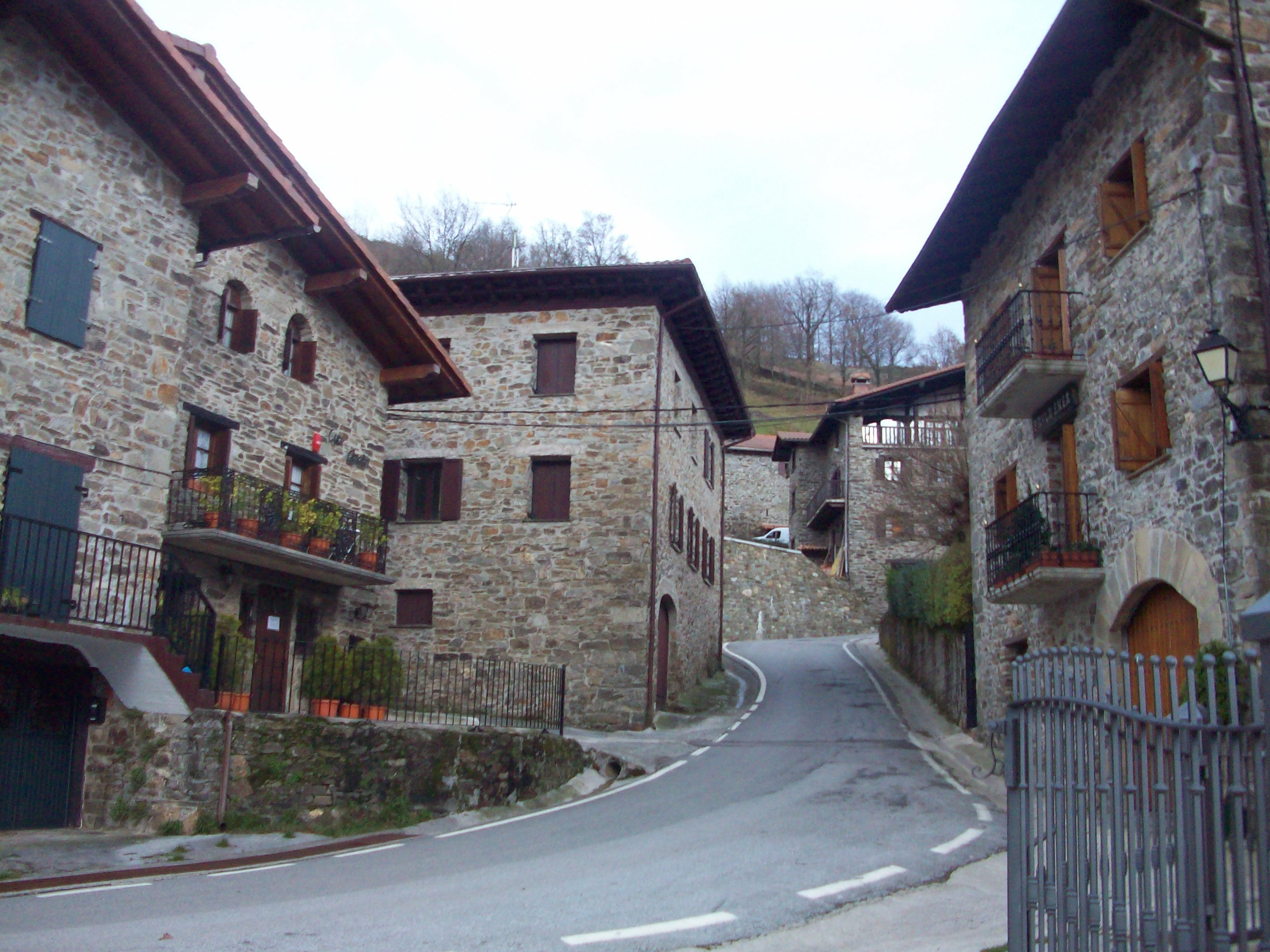
Street of Arano, Navarre, Spain

Arano's coat of arms

Arano is a village and municipality located in the province and autonomous community of Navarre, northern Spain.
