= Trainera =

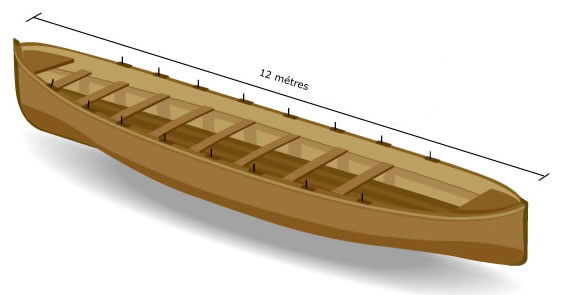
Illustration of a rowing fishing trainera

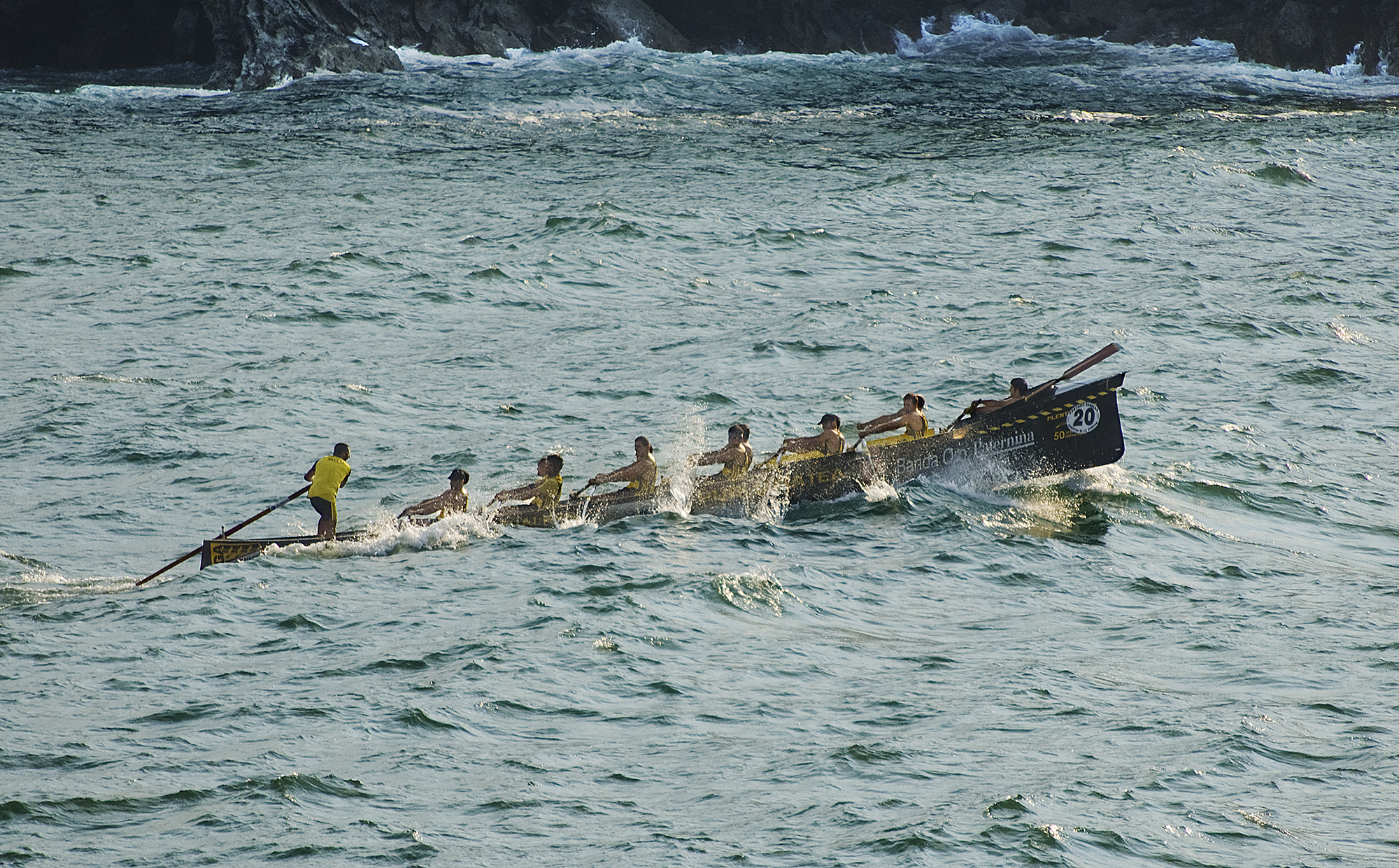
The Arkote Arraun team from Plentzia in the 2007 Kontxako Bandera race

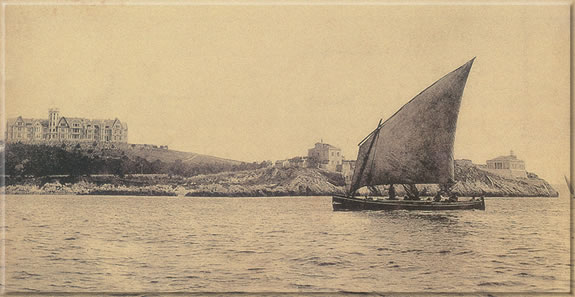
Sail fishing trainera cruising the Bay of Santander, Cantabria, in the early 20th century.

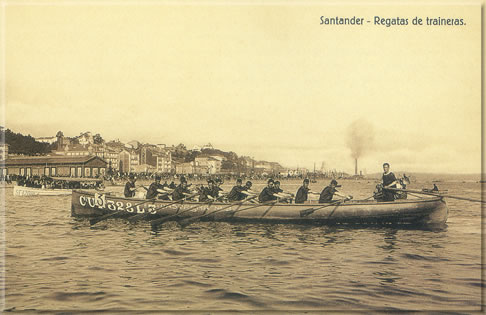
Sports trainera participating in a regatta in the Bay of Santander, Cantabria, in the early 20th century.

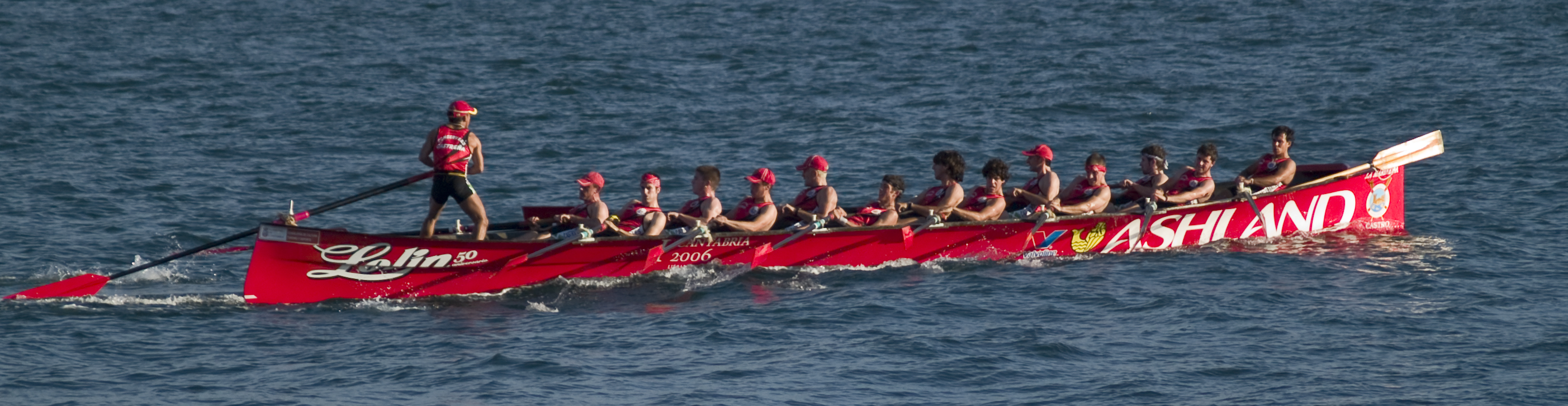
Castro Urdiales rowing team in a 2008 regatta in Santander

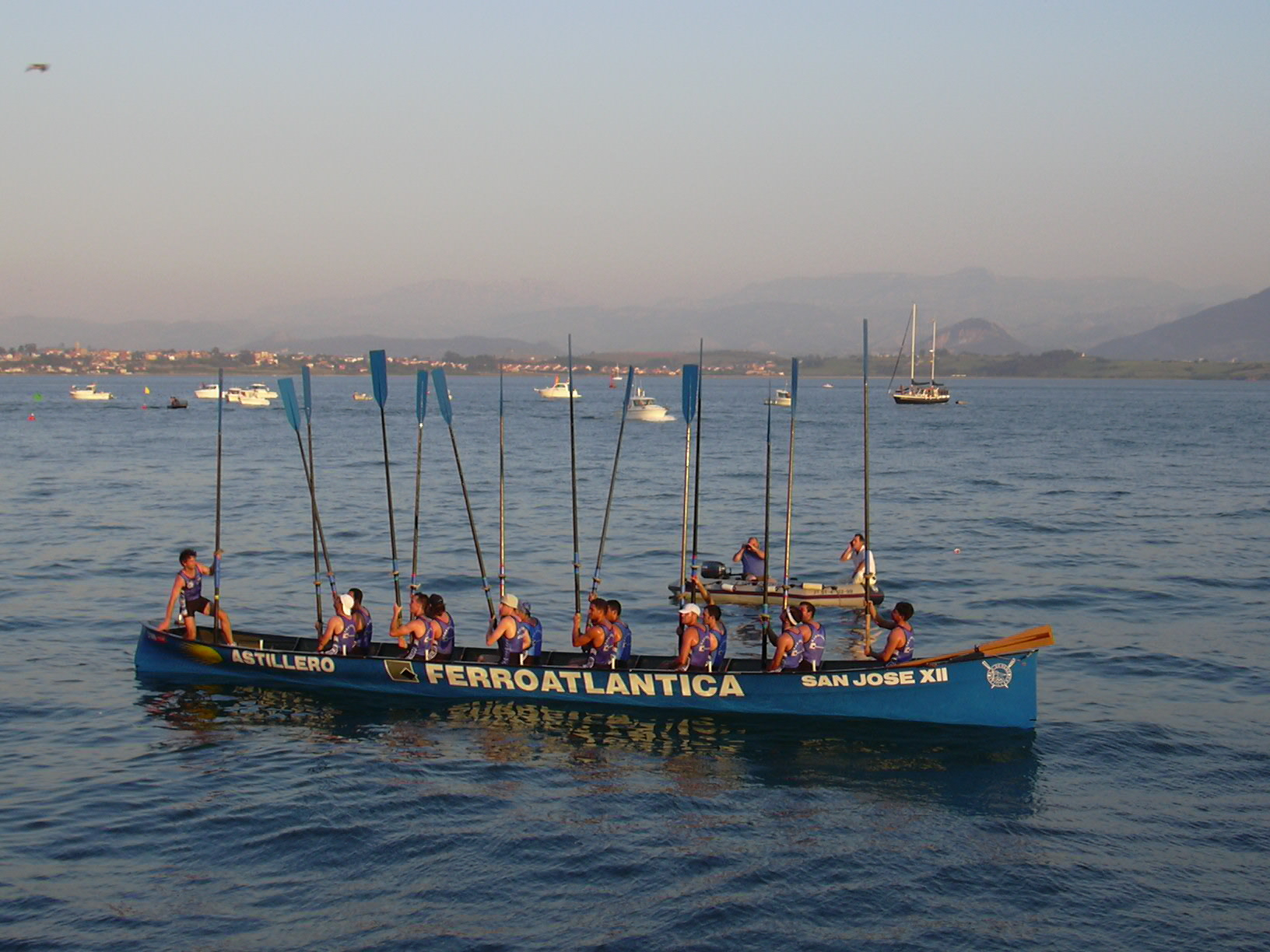
Astillero's "oars up" celebration in Santander

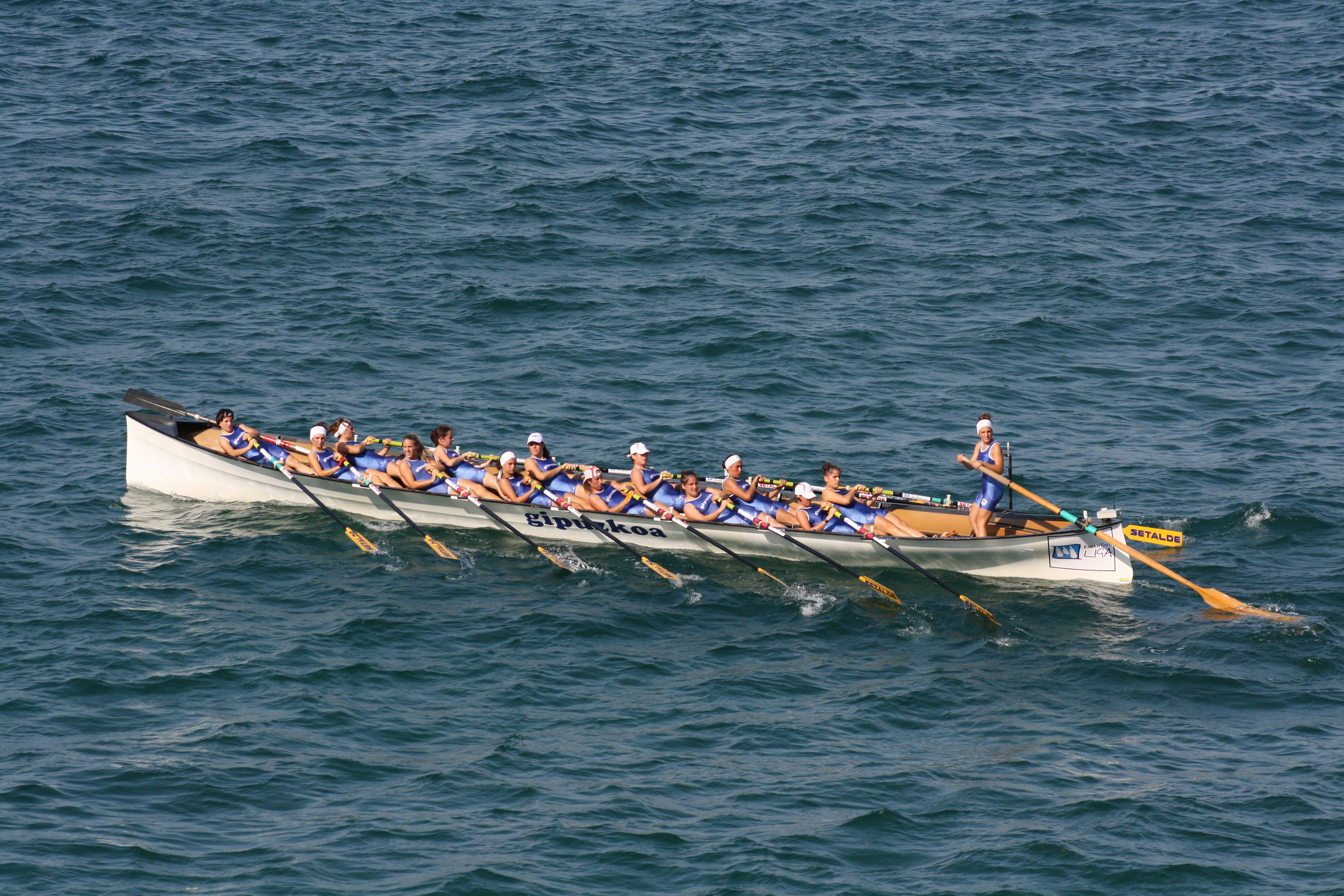
Gipuzkoas female estropadak team racing in Zarautz

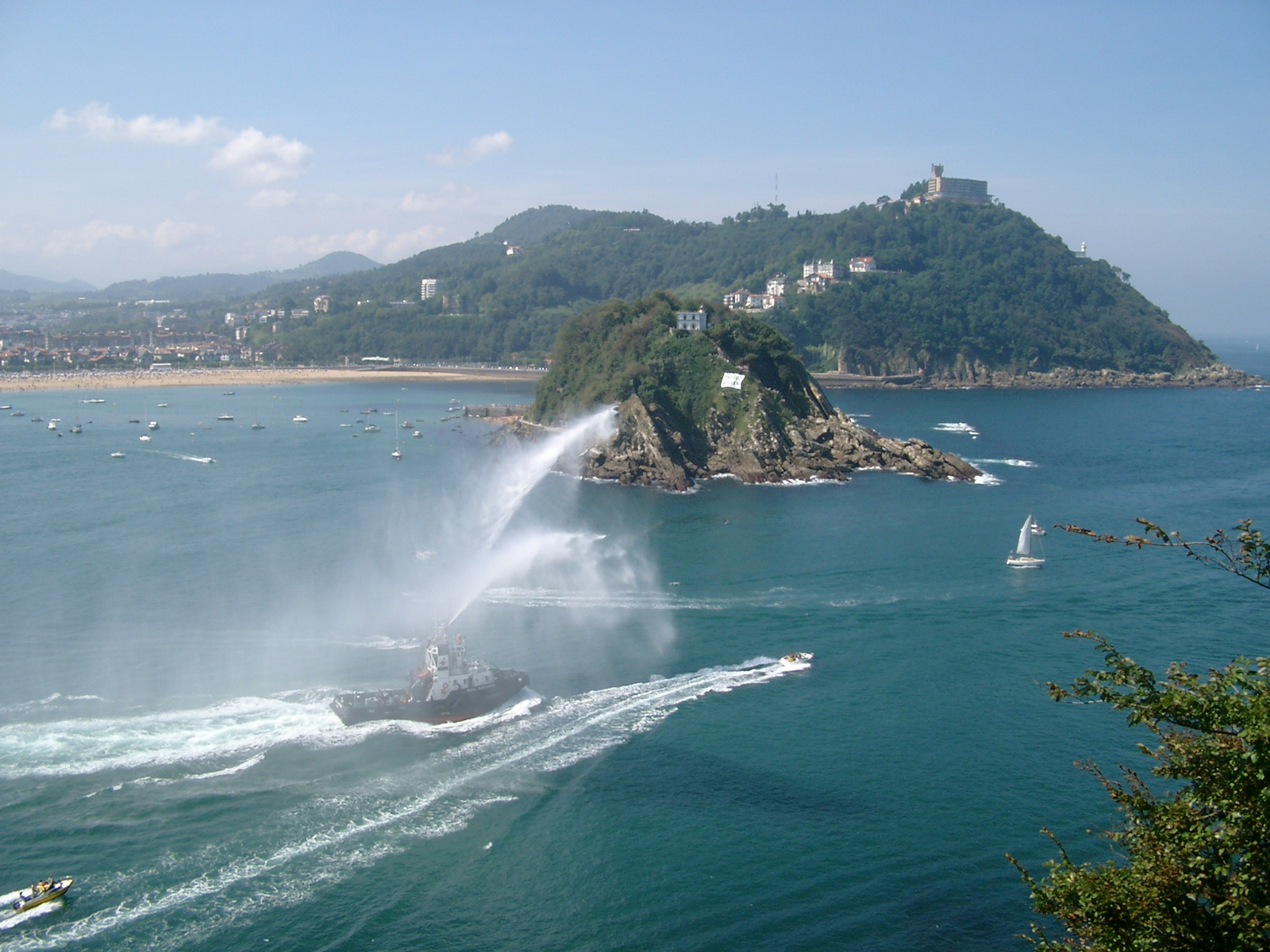
Celebrating the Kontxako Bandera

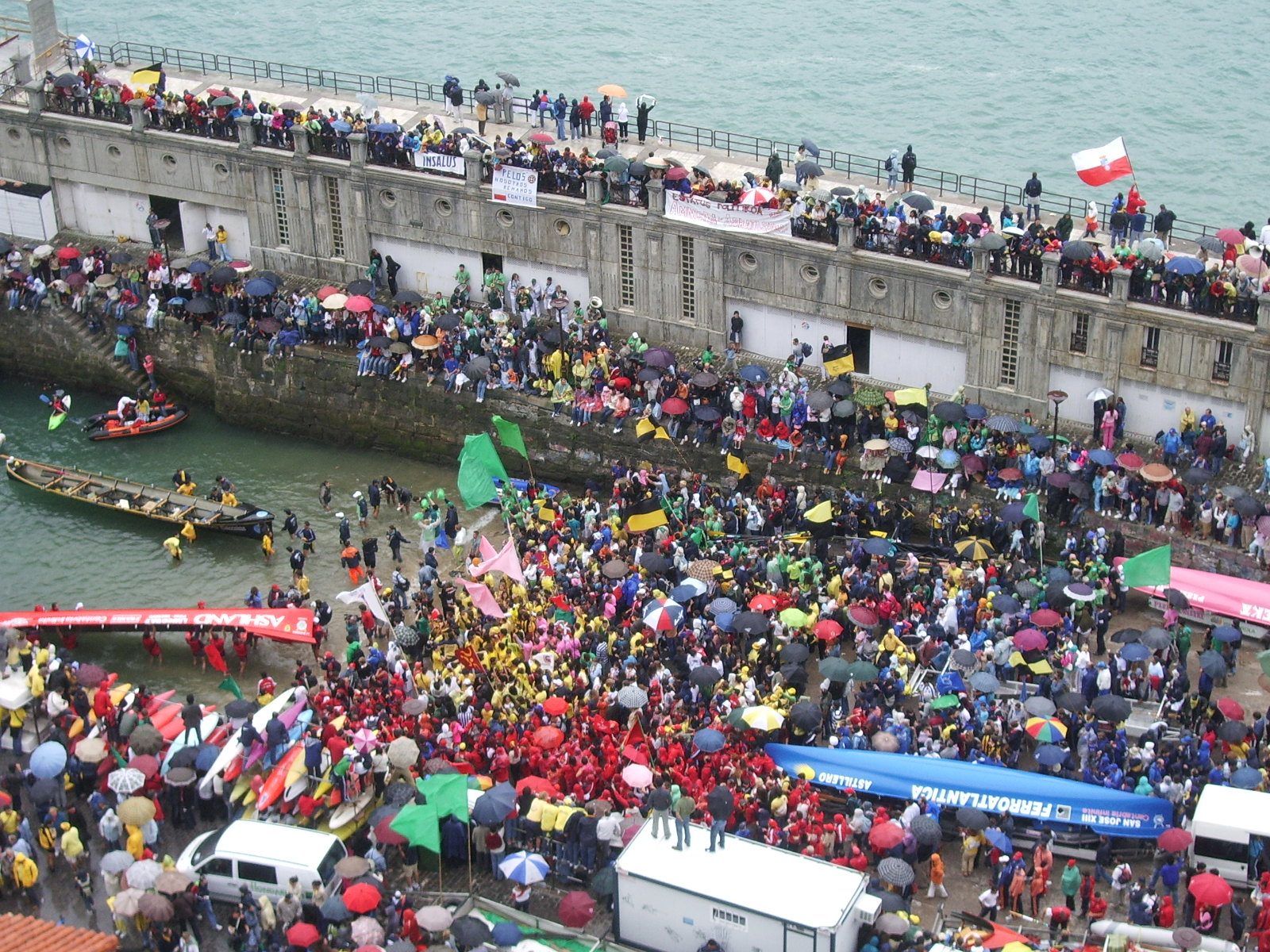
The winners of a race in the 2005 Kontxako Bandera at the quay

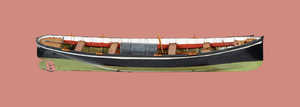
Chipironier or battel or trainera, Basque fishing boat of approximately 6 m (20 ft) equipped with a small engine..

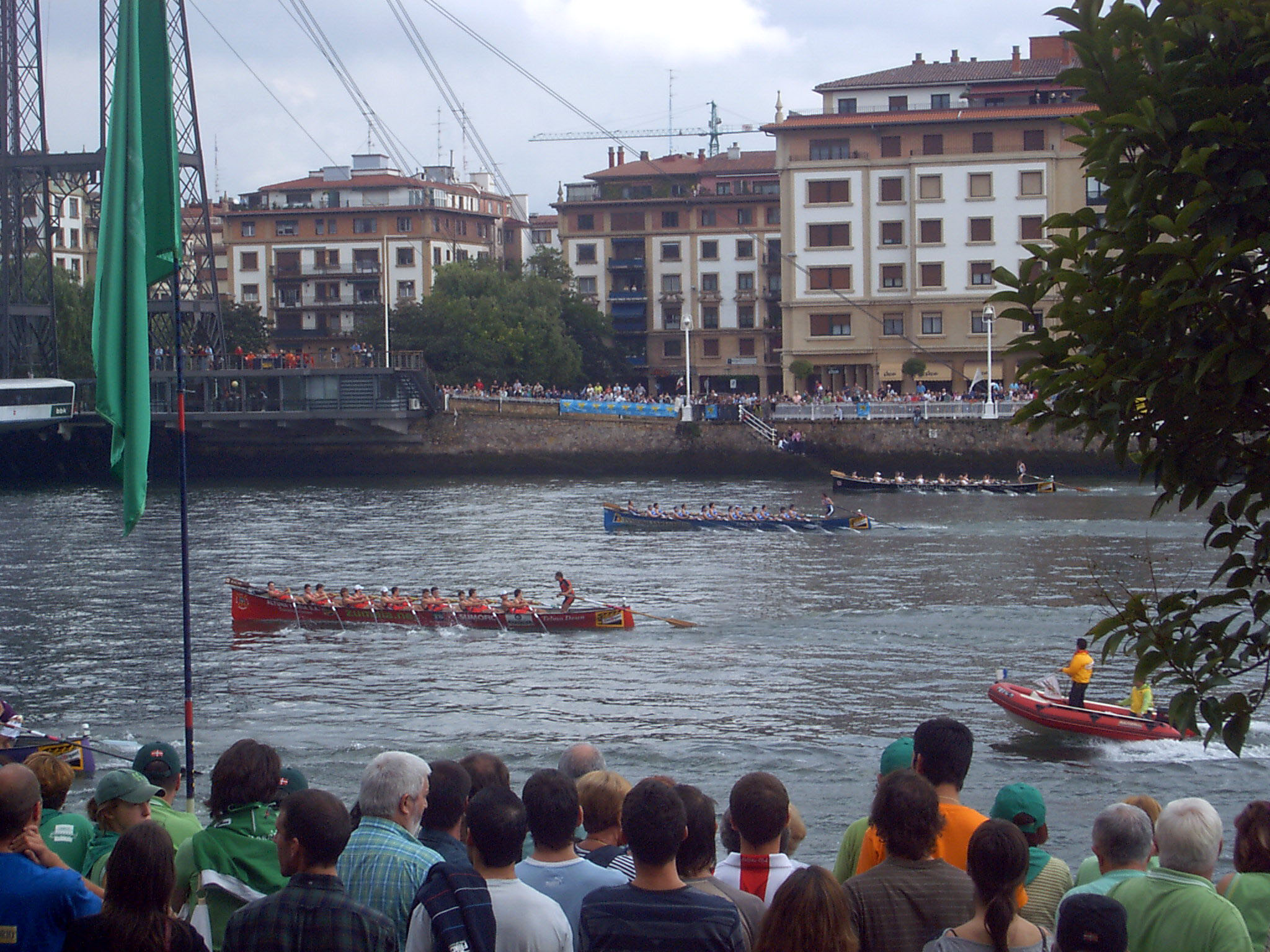
Estropadak in Portugalete

A trainera is a traditional boat of the Cantabrian Sea coast at the southern end of the Bay of Biscay, propelled by oars, and formerly sailing. It is a boat of fine lines with raised prow and rounded stern, to resist the waves of the Cantabrian sea. Traineras were originally used by fishermen to bring in the day’s catch of anchovies and sardines from sea to market, usually competing to sell their caught fish before others came in. Today, this historical tradition has become a major sport of coastal boat racing.

== Other languages and etymology ==
The name trainera (Spanish), traineru (also treineru, treñero or triñero in Basque), traînière (French), traiñeira (also traíña in Galician) and traineira (Portuguese) is derived from the word traína, a closely woven net used in the fishing of sardines and anchovies, itself derived from Latin tragināre, from trahĕre "to pull, drag".

== Distribution ==
The historic trainera regattas, estropadak in Basque, are a popular sport held all along the Bay of Biscay, all the way through the coast of Basque Country, Cantabria, Asturias and Galicia between July and October. Numerous competitions are held each year such as the oldest regatta Bandera de Santander or the most famous Kontxako Bandera, and there are various trainera leagues such as the premier league Liga San Miguel or the second divisions Liga Asociación de Remo del Cantábrico and Liga Galega de Traiñeiras.

== Boats and rules ==
Today the boats are crewed by 13 rowers sitting in pairs (except for the thirteenth, who sits alone in the bows) and a cox standing up facing them in the stern. The bowman or bow-woman also has a 15th oar which is used for helping with the steering in tight turns. As is common in other such events, the cox is responsible for steering the boat and keeping up the morale of the team. Each boat flies a particular flag and wears a team strip and often the boat is painted in the team's colours as well.

Traditional materials were entirely cedar and beech wood, with the construction process taking at least a month or month and a half. The boats themselves are 12m long, 1.72m wide (at midship), 95 cm. bow, 75 cm stern and 60.5 cm in depth. The total weight of the boat including baton, bench, and hitters have to be 210–230 kg but may not weigh less than 200 kg (excluding oars and equipment). Nowadays, traineras are made of carbon fiber and kevlar with techniques similar to those in aeronautical construction (such as for Airbus wings. Boats are fitted amongst other things with GPS systems, creating better boats but also pushing up prices. The lifespan of a boat at a top club is usually two or three years. In the 1970s a trainera cost around 45,000 pesetas; 2008 prices start at around €25,000.

A race normally covers a distance of 5.5 km with either a single trip to a buoy and back or two return trips. Each boat has its own lane and may not cross into another boat's lane and the oars (and boats) of different boats may not touch. A race is normally restarted if something irregular happens within the first 20 seconds of a race. Apart from the prize money for each race, the winning team is awarded a bandera (flag) of the town or autonomous community. The winning team traditionally holds all oars vertically into the air, the so-called remos arriba or arraunak gora, "oars up".

== Women and traineras ==
Although most rowing teams were male, evidence from the historical bertsos tells us that female rowers existed, referred to as batelerak in Basque. The name derives from batel, a name for a smaller type of boat with 4 rowers and a cox. Evidence can also be seen in the traditional batelera dantza (batelera dance) which is performed by women with oars.

More recently, female teams have also begun to take plains in the trainera regattas proper.

== History ==
The origins of the various kinds of trainera regatta lie in fishing and whaling, both highly important sources of income in earlier periods. Traditionally, the first boat back at the quay got the best price for their fish. As the boat and all equipment was usually owned by the skipper and the crew hired by oral contract, the skipper would first deduct the boat and net share (25%) from the earnings, then deduct any further expenses for bait and provisions. Only then would the remained be shared in equal parts so it was in everybody's interest to get back as fast as possible to get the best price possible.

Similarly, when whaling was at its height in along the Bay of Biscay teams would race to be the first to reach a sighted whale.

The boats used in the regattas were originally working fishing boats, the frame made from oak and the hull from pine. There were three main categories:

- The trainera which has and elevated prow and rounded stern, ideally suited for navigating the choppy waters off the coast at speed needed to catch anchovy and sardines. The crew consists of 13 rowers and one cox. The rowers are divided into two rows of six, plus the bow rower, who is alone on his bench.
- The trainerilla (Spanish for 'little trainera') has a crew of 6 rowers and one cox, all sitting in a row.
- The batel or chipironier is a smaller boat used close to the coast for a variety of fish, with 4 rowers and a cox.
- The bateliku is a smaller boat used close to the coast for a variety of fish, with 3 rowers and a cox.

Since the year 1850, there was evidence of challenges in the Cantabrian village of Castro Urdiales between local crews and sometimes with the Biscayans who were manning the Coast Guard cutters.

The first documented regatta which was held as a sporting event was in 1859 in the Bay of Santander between the people of Castro Urdiales and some Biscayan crews. The Castro Urdiales team won the race and regattas have been held as sporting event ever since.

Much more important was the race held in Santander two years later, in 1861, in the presence of Queen Isabella II on official visit to the capital of Cantabria. The Cantabrians beat back to the Biscayans and the local press echoed the news and even a famous folk song known as the Jota del Regateo was composed. The Flag of Santander is still held today, making it the oldest rowing competition that is still celebrated in Spain.

The first documented estropada in Basque Country was twelve years later, in 1871, between the people of Hondarribia and Pasaia, involving a bet about who could reach San Sebastián first setting our from Hondarribia. The Pasaia team won the 13 mile race. Originally the teams would race from one particular seaside town to another but today most races are held locally.

In 1916 a man from Mutriku called Bizente Ormazabal built a new, sleek type of boat for a group from Getaria called Golondrina (Spanish for 'swallow'). At the same time motors (chipironier) were introduced to the fishing industry so the commercial use of rowing boats quickly disappeared and more and more were used for the estropadak. Over time the design changed, building more for speed than fishing, reducing the weight and the width.

As rowing turned from a profession into a sport, fewer and fewer fishermen competed and more and more teams were put together from non-seafaring backgrounds as they could train more regularly than fishermen.

The most famous of all trainera regattas today is the Kontxako Estropadak, Kontxako Bandera o Bandera de la Concha, Kontxako Badia / Bahía de la Concha being the name of the main bay of San Sebastián. It was first organised by the city's council in 1879 and is said to have drawn a crowd of some 12,000 spectators.

== Notable clubs ==
Basque Country

- Aita Mari Arraun Taldea (Zumaia), officially founded in 1975
- Arkote Arraun Taldea (Plentzia), officially founded in 1957
- Deustu Arraun Taldea (Deustu), officially founded in 1981
- Getariako Arraun Elkartea (Getaria), officially founded in 1976
- Hondarribia Arraun Elkartea (Hondarribia), going back to 1862
- Itsasoko Ama (Santurtzi), officially founded in 1967
- Isuntza Arraun Elkartea (Lekeitio), officially founded in 1977
- Kaiku Arraunaren Kirol Elkartea (Sestao), officially founded in 1923 with a traineru called Bizkaitarra
- Orio Arraun Elkartea (Orio), going back to 1879 and to date is the team which has won the Kontxako Bandera the most times
- Sanpedrotarra Arraun Elkartea (Pasaia), going back to 1880
- San Nicolás Arraun Taldea (Portugalete), officially founded in 1892
- Urdaibai Arraun (Urdaibai area), officially founded in 1992 by clubs from Bermeo, Elantxobe and Mundaka to promote the sport in the area
- Zarauzko Arraun Elkartea (Zarautz), officially founded in 1983

Cantabria

- Sociedad deportiva de remo Astillero (El Astillero), officially founded in 1966
- Club de remo Camargo (Maliaño), officially founded in 1979
- Sociedad deportiva de remo Castro-Urdiales (Castro-Urdiales), going back to 1879
- Club de remo Colindres (Colindres), officially founded in 1988
- Club de remo La Maruca (Santander), officially founded in 1975
- Laredo Remo Club (Laredo), officially founded in 1975
- Sociedad deportiva de remo Pedreña (Pedreña), going back to 1895
- Club de remo Pontejos (Pontejos), officially founded in 1964
- Club de remo Ciudad de Santander (Santander), officially founded in 1988
- Club de remo Santander (Santander), officially founded in 1971
- Santoña Club de remo (Santoña), officially founded in 1979

Galicia

- Club de remo Cabo de Cruz (Boiro), officially founded in 1979
- Club de remo Mecos (O Grove), officially founded in 1980
- Sociedade deportiva Samertolameu (Meira), officially founded in 1979
- Sociedade deportiva Tirán (Moaña), officially founded in 1993

The founding dates can be somewhat misleading as many clubs existed long before they were formally founded as clubs.

== See also ==
- Basque rural sports

== See as well ==
- batel
- Batteleku
- Chipironier
