= Chipironier =

Basque boat

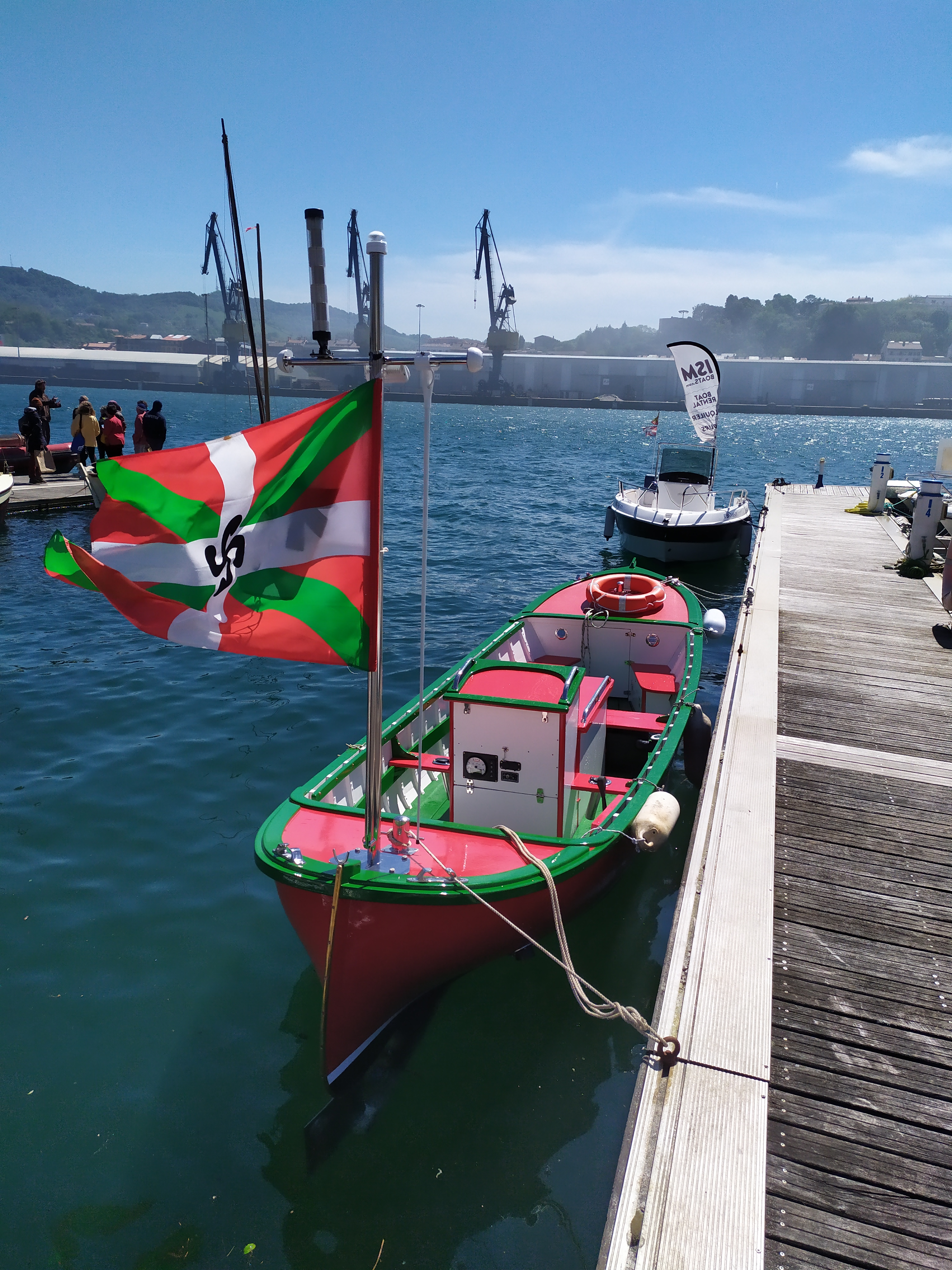
Wooden chipironier, new, 5.80 m, equipped with a 3-cylinder 21 hp diesel engine, built in 2024 by the Basque shipwright Otoserroi-Wulfram Larrieu

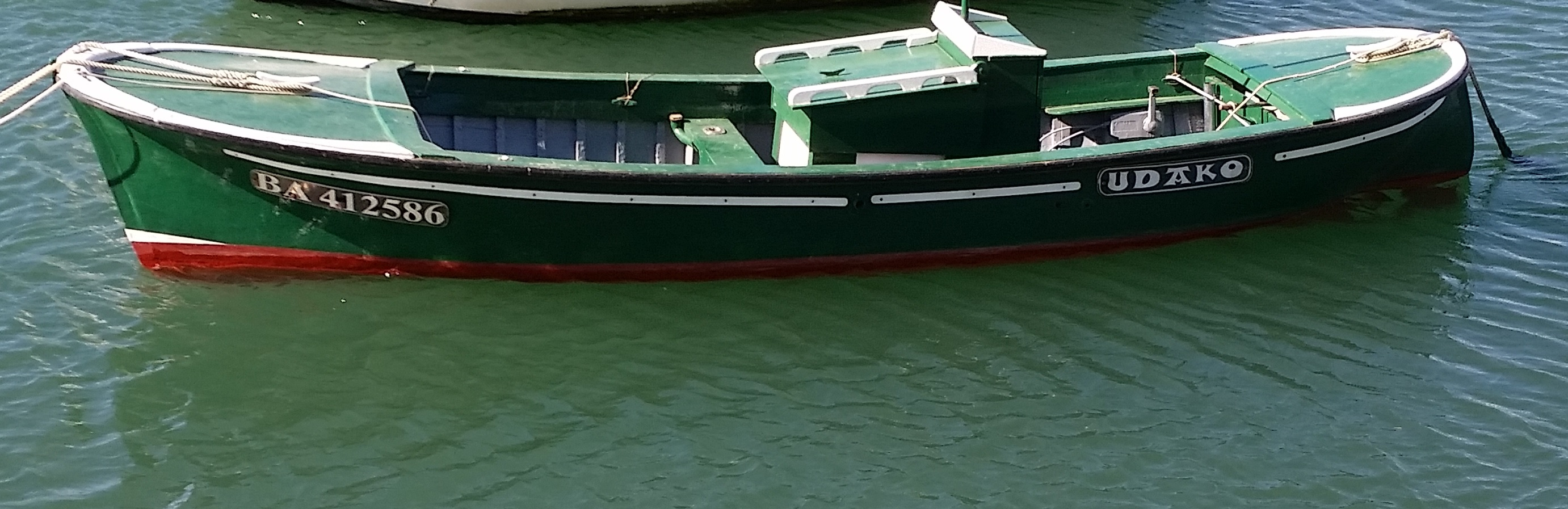
Udako – wooden chipironier built in Pasaia in 1960 – 5.6 m × 1.6 m × 0.5 m (18.4 ft × 5.2 ft × 1.6 ft)

Chipironier, also known as a batel, batteleku trainera or "gazolin", are one of the smallest traditional coastal fishing vessels on the Basque coast. Originally made of wood, with a length of 4.50 to 8 m (14.8 to 26.2 ft), its lines are characteristic of the long tradition of Basque shipbuilding in the Basque country. First operated by sail and rowing, this type of propulsion has greatly influenced the architecture of coastal navigation boats. It produced boats with long, narrow, light shapes and shallow draft, shapes which offered little resistance to advancement. These boats adopted the engine at the beginning of the 20th century from 1920. The crew is made up of one to five men.

== Etymology ==
The origin of the word chipironier is due to the fact that this boat is often used for fishing for chipirons, (squid in Basque language).

== Historical ==
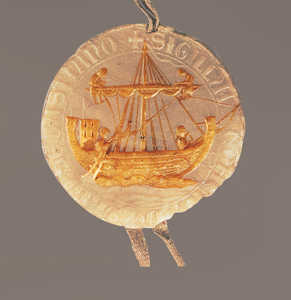
Seal of the city of San Sebastian from 1352 representing a Basque boat attesting to a well-established naval tradition.

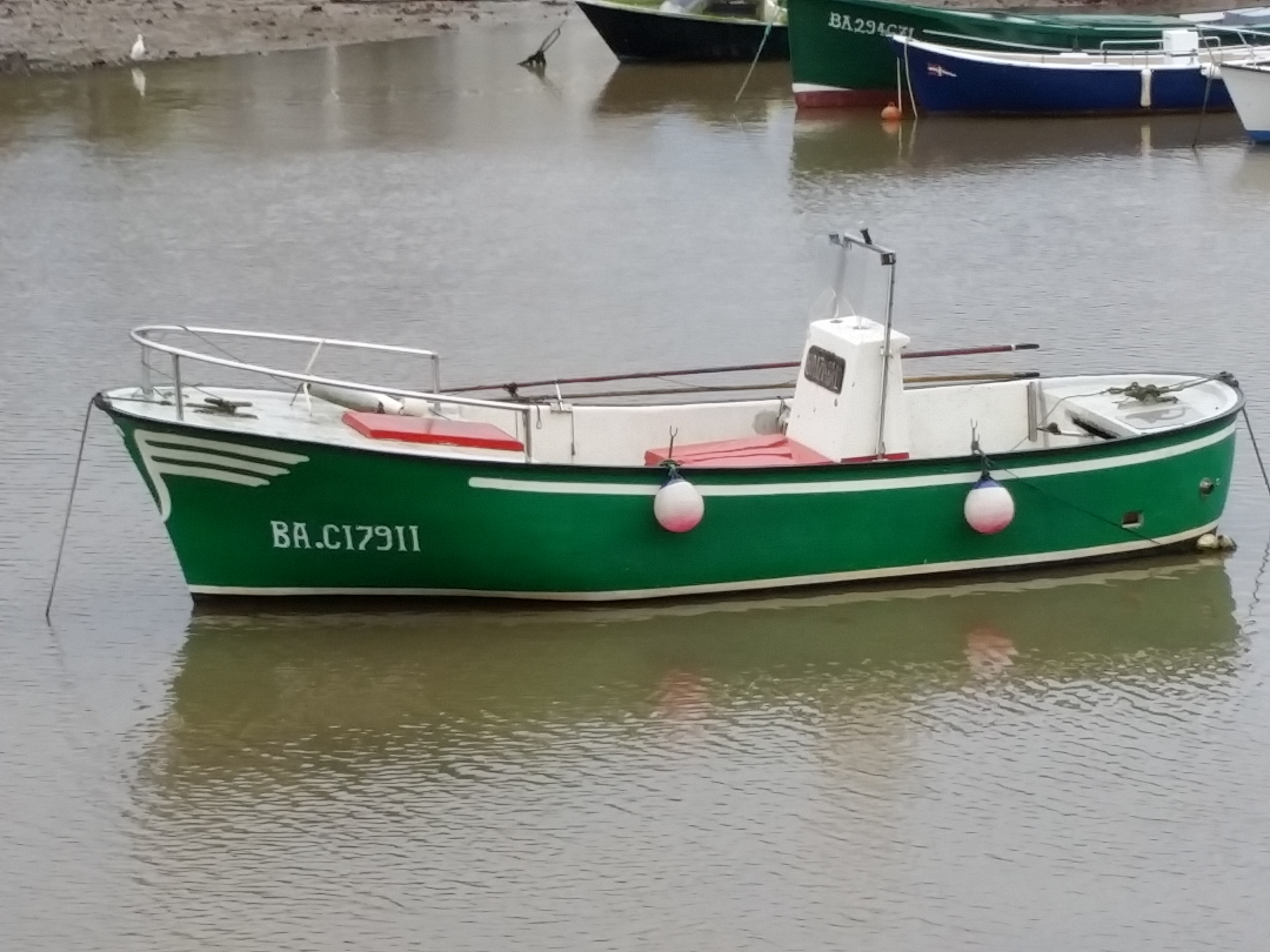
Polyester chipironier shop in Ciboure

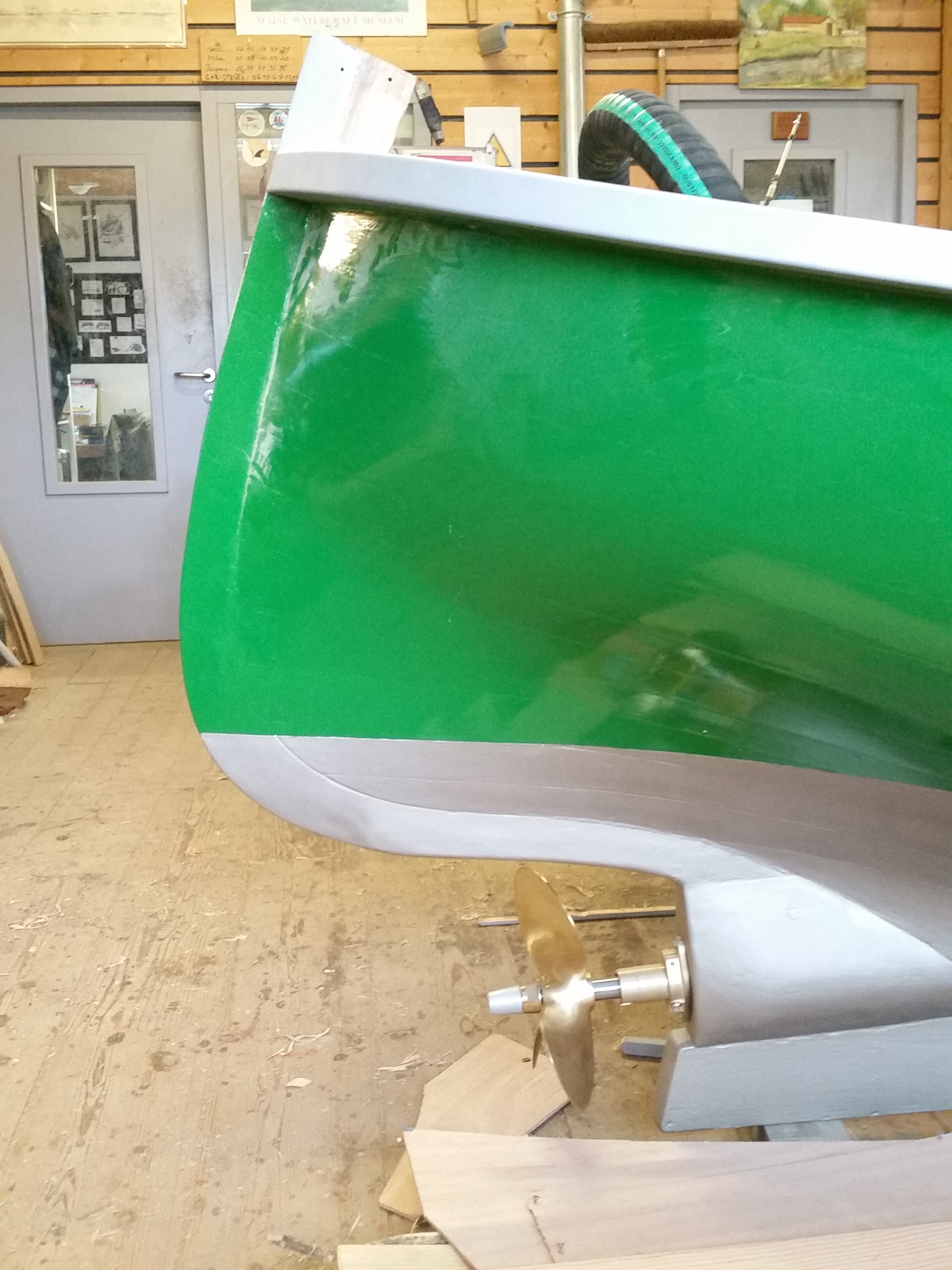
Very pronounced inverted stern post of a wooden chipironier, typical of Basque shipbuilding

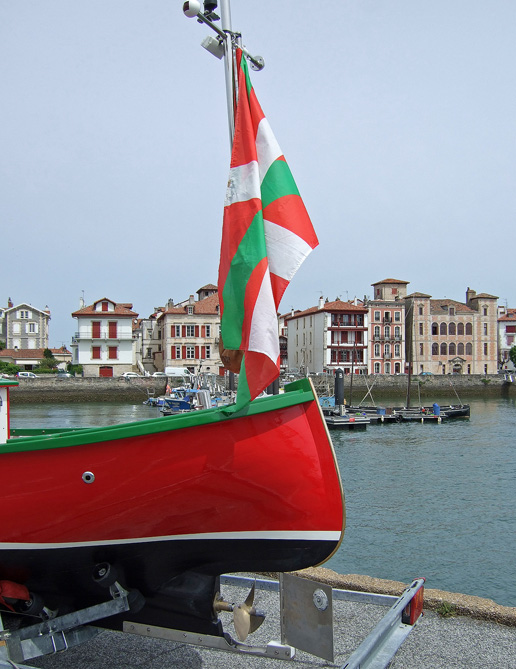
Very pronounced inverted stern post of a new wooden chipironier ship, typical of Basque shipbuilding-240513

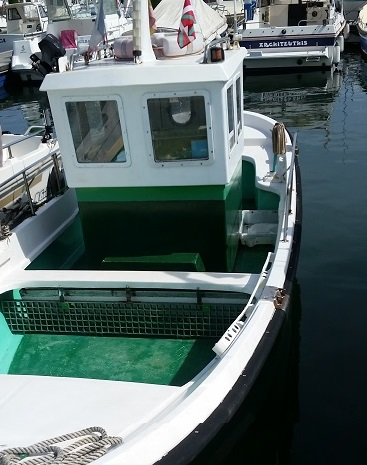
Small polyester chipironier boat with a small cabin in the port of Hondarribia in 2023. In this way, it imitates the largest fishing units on the Basque coast

Small fishing boats have existed for a very long time (in the ordinances of the brotherhood of Bermeo written 1353, battela are mentioned as of medium importance). This type of construction has been documented since at least the 13th century. It can be found in the Archives nationales in Paris on the wax imprint of the seal of the city of San Sebastian, affixed to a document from the year 1297.

== Use ==
Widely used for fishing for squid, anchovies, mackerel and hake. Also for longline fishing, with small gillnets and also with traps for crustaceans. Some, although it is not usual or highly recommended, due to the lack of a covered bridge, go far out to sea on good summer days to fish for tuna when it approaches about 16–24 km (10–15 mi) from the coast.

== Type of construction ==
Chipironiers were built out of wood until the 1980s. Several shipyards, including Olaciregui à Hondaribia, switched to polyester fiber construction and within 40 years almost all wooden chipironiers had been replaced by fiber versions. Across the Basque ports from Bayonne to Berméo, few wooden chipironiers remain. However, the lack of a deck has remained, giving chipironiers a unique characteristic unusual to either calmer coasts or rough seas like the Bay of Biscay. Even examples built in fiber are deckless except for a few rare units. Occasionally, a small cockpit-cabin is erected behind the engine cover.

== Wooden construction ==
Its wooden construction requires significant know-how which makes amateur construction impossible, or at least extremely difficult. Especially since these constructions were most of the time made from a half-shell and not from plans. The half-shell is the basic element of wooden construction. Dismantable, it is from it that the water lines and all the dimensions of the future chipironier maker are taken. It constitutes the plan of the boat. The half-hull is made from two different woods which mark the waterline

The lines of a chipironier are very characteristic, but still allow a certain number of variations. The shape of its hull can be defined as follows: The bow is generally straight, a little protruding and very tulip-shaped, the sides slightly frigate, the stern pinched, the inverted sternpost very pronounced, the positive sheer is relatively marked. The planks are very pinched. A protective steel fitting (soft strip traditionally made of bronze) is affixed all the way under the keel, from the stem to the sternpost. It is above all their size that allows these boats to be distinguished. Knowing that the longest hulls have induced technical changes such as an alternation between scrolled frames and others in hot-bent acacia. Its structure is composed of a set of planking in pichpin (softwood without knots whose hardness almost reaches that of oak) or in northern pine, scalloped (sawn) oak frames, acacia floors heated with steam to bend them more easily and hot riveted to the planks (this technique is the most respectful of the line of the wood) and an oak keel. The pieces of oak are chosen carefully, so that the wood fibers follow the curves of the piece that will result from it.

Only these formal characteristics apply to several boats typical of the Basque Country whose lengths vary from 4.50 meters to a little over 20 meters. This set of boats includes in particular: the batteliku, the battel, the battel handi, the dragerille, the dragiere, and larger fishing units of which only a few representatives remain today in Labourd: the Patchiku in Bayonne and the sardine-tuna fishing boat "Aïrosa" in the port of Saint-Jean-de-Luz, built in 1953 by the Hiribarren brothers, both classified as historic monuments, the chipironier-haking boat Turlutia built in 1954 in Ciboure, classified also since 2019 and some other rare units. After the total disappearance of the traditional wooden chipironier construction, the Albaola association is saving and restoring it at the Factoria in Pasaia in Guipuzkoa as well as the Euskal Batel Eroak association in Lekeitio as well as the Egurrezkoa association and the Marin shipyard, in Saint Jean de Luz-Ciboure and l'association Itsas Begia. In Guiche, the association Les Escumayres Talasta also.

The chipironers or batels were first equipped with small gasoline engines (hence their nickname "gazolin") then with diesel engines. To do this the sampling was increased, the width enlarged and the addition of a thick keel allowed the passage of the propeller shaft.

On the aft deck is erected a small mast with a fixed sail which can be one-third or triangular. Its function is not driving as it might seem, but to avoid rolling and to counter the wind, both when sailing and when fishing with the engine stopped. Position and navigation lights are usually installed on it. We can also see some chipironier dealers with a small cabin. In this they imitate the largest fishing units on the Basque coast. But it is more common in Cantabrian ports than in Basque ports.

== Renewal ==
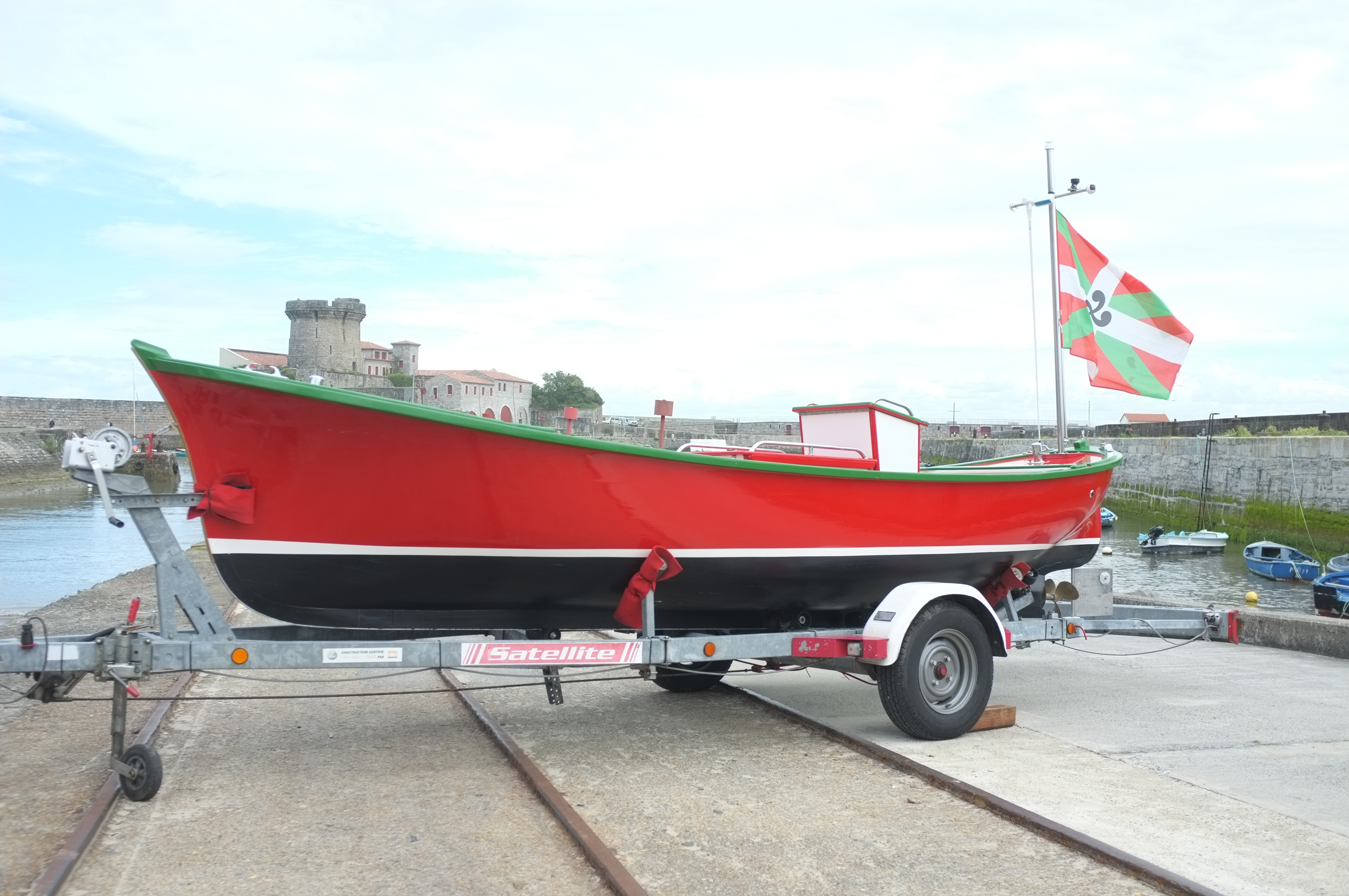
Wooden chipironera ship, 5.80 m, equipped with a 3-cylinder 21 hp diesel engine, built in 2024, photographed on the port of Socoa-240513

After the total disappearance of the traditional wooden chipiron construction, a Basque marine carpenter has been rebuilding it since 2023. Named Elkano, 6 meters long, powered by a 21-horsepower three-cylinder diesel. It will be inaugurated during the Pasaia maritime festival from 9 to 12 May 2024.

== See also ==
- batel
- batteleku
- Trainera
