= Kontxako Bandera =

Spanish coastal rowing competition

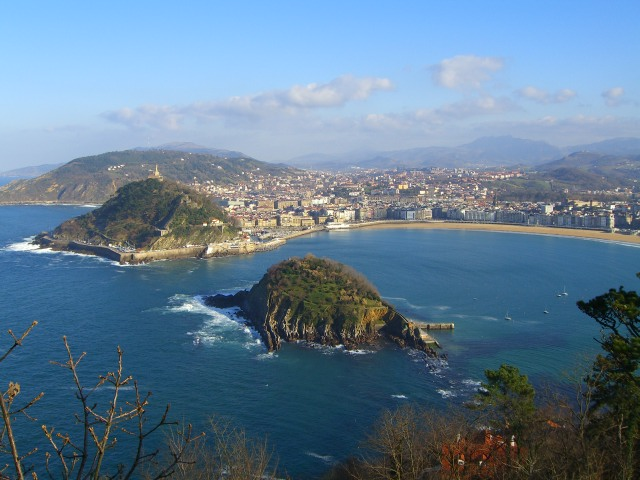
The Kontxa

The Kontxako Bandera (Basque) or Bandera de la Concha (in Spanish, meaning "Flag of the Kontxa") is one of the oldest and most famous estropada race along the Bay of Biscay, held annually in the Kontxa, the main bay of San Sebastián, Spain. It takes place on the first two weekends in September and regularly draws crowds of more than 100,000 people and around 20 rowing teams. It was first held in 1879 and has been held most years since with the main exception of the war years.

In Galician it's called Bandeira da Cuncha and Drapeau de La Concha in French.

== Background ==
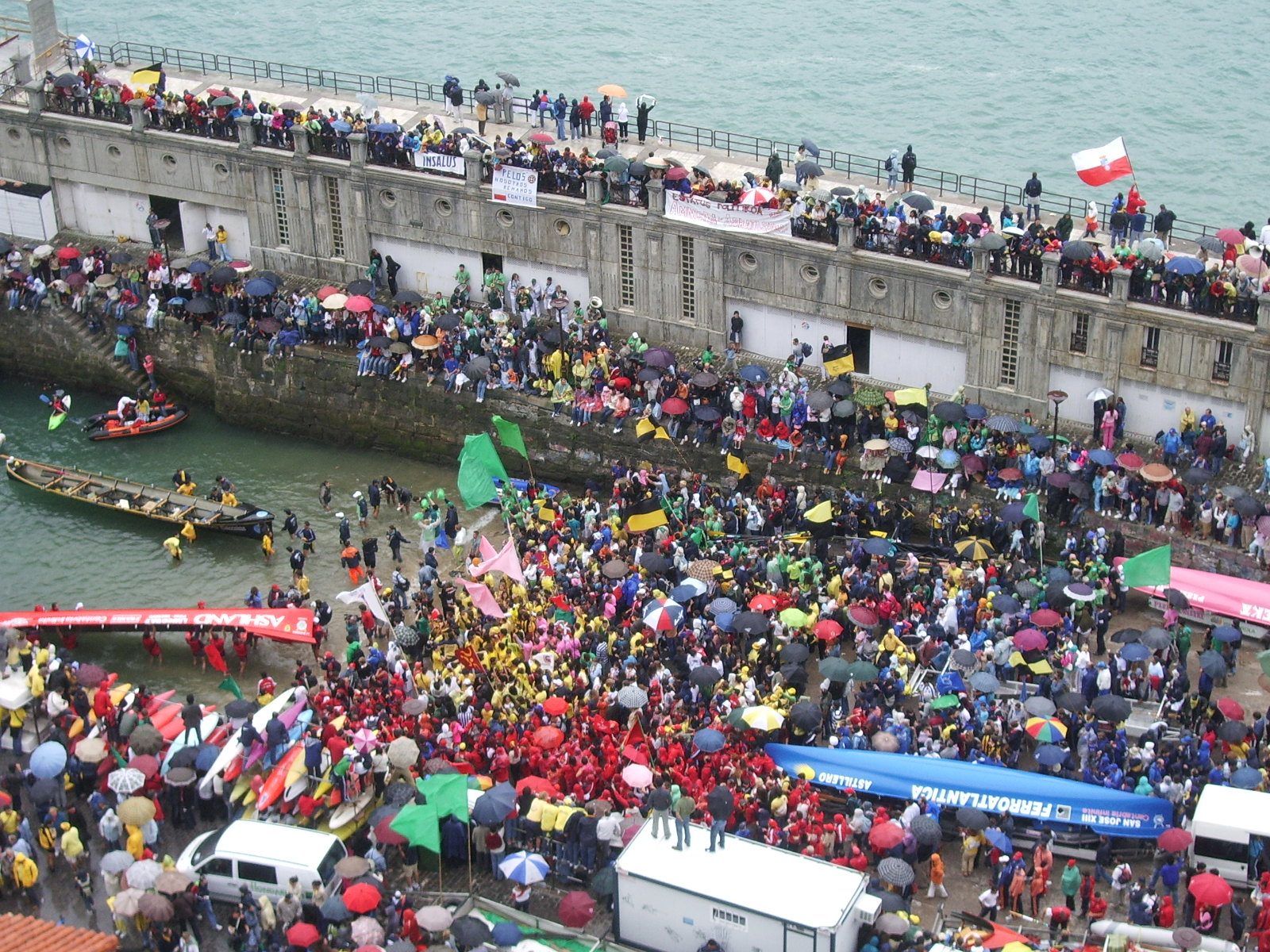
The 2005 winners of the bandera at the quay

Estropadak is a very popular form of rowing competition common all along the Northern coast of the Iberian Peninsula.

A crew is made up of thirteen oarsmen and the cox, who faces them at the stern. The boats are called traineru (trainera in Spanish, trainière in French) and are derived from 19th century fishing boats.

This is the most important competition in the Bay of Biscay and takes place the first two Sundays in September, within the framework of the Basque Week, with the best teams from all along the Northern coast competing against each other.

The teams must row three nautical miles to a buoy, turn around and return to the starting line. So instead of the normal four lengths, teams only do two lengths in this race.

The final always consists of two races between the eight finalists. To qualify, all teams bar one must take part in a race against the clock on the first weekend, the seven best of which go forward to the finals the following weekend. The eighth team is always from the host town and does not have to qualify. In the finals, the eight teams race in two groups of four across the same distance again.

For example, in the 2007 race there were 21 teams taking part:

Team	Time to buoy	Time to finish
Hondarribia	11:12	20:56
Urdaibai	11:15	20:58
Zarautz	11:15	21:00
Orio	11:04	21:02
Castro	11:18	21:09
Pedreña	11:15	21:09
Tirán	11:16	21:10
Pasai San Pedro	11:25	21:19
Zumaia	11:31	21:20
Laredo	11:16	21:26
Getaria	11:32	21:43
Pasai Donibane	11:40	21:50
Arkote	11:34	21:54
Isuntza	11:42	21:54
Mecos	11:43	21:55
Cabo da Cruz	11:43	21:56
Sestao	11:43	21:57
Ondarroa	11:56	22:08
Camargo	11:51	22:17
Hernani	12:46	23:44
Urki	12:48	23:49

Of these, the top seven went into the final which Orio won with a time of 19:16.68.

== Statistics ==
- The most successful teams in the Kontxako Bandera are Orio (32 flags), Pasai San Pedro (15 flags), San Sebastián (14 flags), Hondarribia (14 flags) and Pasai Donibane (10 flags).
- The fastest times were achieved by Castro Urdiales (18:59.94 in 2006) and El Astillero (19:05.02 in 2006 and 19:09.10 in 2005)

== Winning teams ==
Listed here after their town with the name of the team given in brackets:

=== 1879–1900 ===
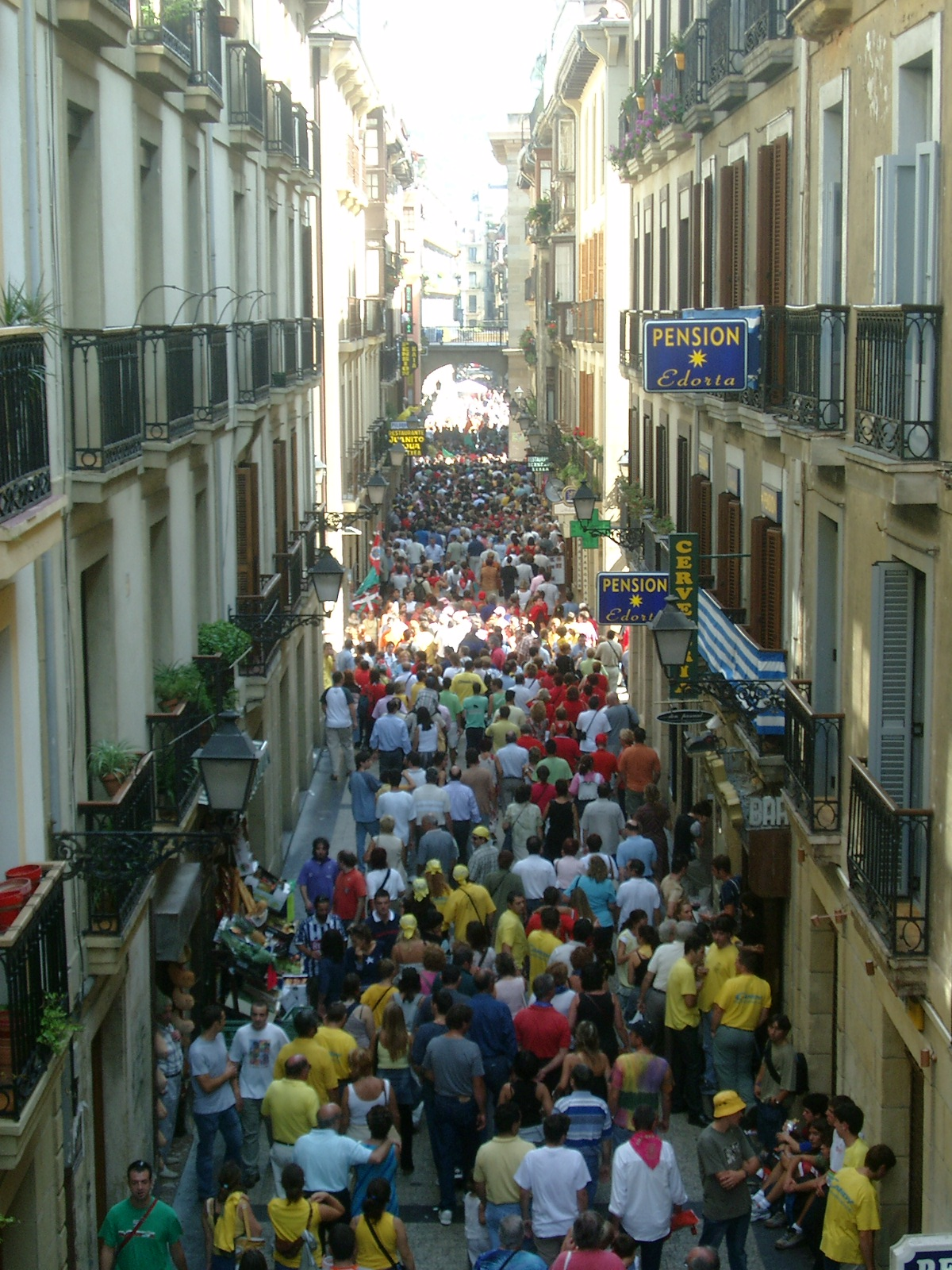
The crowds in the old town on the day of the bandera

1. 1879 San Sebastián
2. 1880 Pasai San Pedro
3. 1881 Hondarribia
4. 1882 –
5. 1883 San Sebastián
6. 1884 –
7. 1885 –
8. 1886 –
9. 1887 San Sebastián
10. 1888 –
11. 1889 San Sebastián
12. 1890 San Sebastián
13. 1891 San Sebastián
14. 1892 San Sebastián
15. 1893 –
16. 1894 San Sebastián
17. 1895 Getaria
18. 1896 Getaria
19. 1897 San Sebastián
20. 1898 Ondarroa
21. 1899 Pasai San Pedro
22. 1900 Getaria

=== 1901–1950 ===
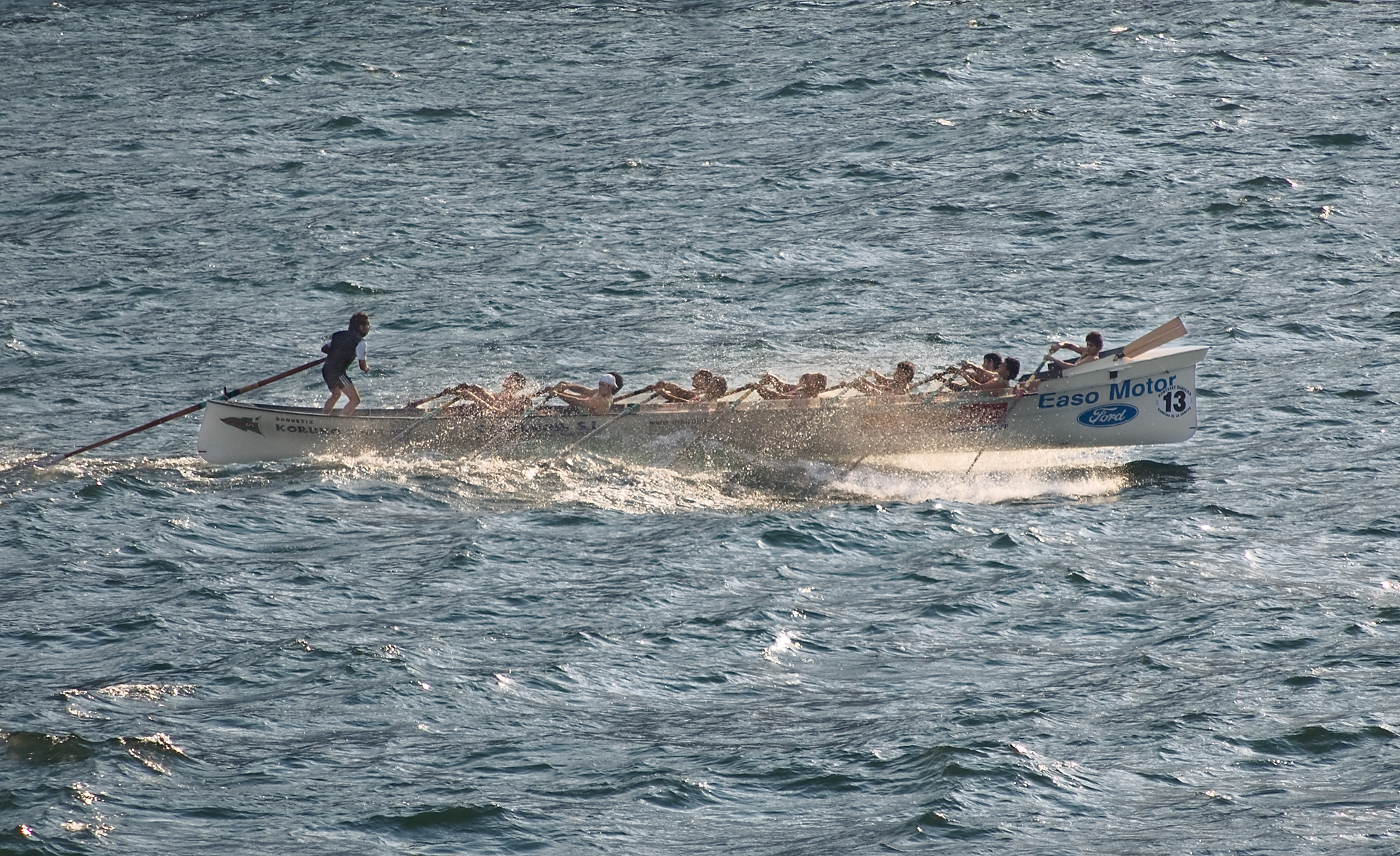
Competing for the Flag of Kontxa

1. 1901 Orio
2. 1902 –
3. 1903 Getaria
4. 1904 –
5. 1905 –
6. 1906 Pasai San Pedro
7. 1907 –
8. 1908 –
9. 1909 Orio
10. 1910 Orio
11. 1911 Getaria
12. 1912 –
13. 1913 –
14. 1914 –
15. 1915 San Sebastián
16. 1916 Orio
17. 1917 Pasai San Pedro
18. 1918 San Sebastián
19. 1919 Orio
20. 1920 San Sebastián
21. 1921 Pasaia (La Unión)
22. 1922 San Sebastián
23. 1923 Orio
24. 1924 Pasai Donibane
25. 1925 Orio
26. 1926 Ondarroa
27. 1927 Pasai San Pedro
28. 1928 Pasai San Pedro
29. 1929 Pasai San Pedro
30. 1930 Pasai San Pedro
31. 1931 Pasai San Pedro
32. 1932 Pasai San Pedro
33. 1933 Orio
34. 1934 Orio
35. 1935 Pasai San Pedro
36. 1936 –
37. 1937 –
38. 1938 –
39. 1939 Orio
40. 1940 Orio
41. 1941 Hondarribia
42. 1942 Orio
43. 1943 Hondarribia
44. 1944 Orio
45. 1945 Pedreña
46. 1946 Pedreña
47. 1947 Hondarribia
48. 1948 Hondarribia
49. 1949 Pedreña
50. 1950 San Sebastián

=== 1951–2000 ===
1. 1951 Orio
2. 1952 Orio
3. 1953 Orio
4. 1954 Sestao (Iberia)
5. 1955 Orio
6. 1956 Pasai Donibane
7. 1957 Aginaga
8. 1958 Orio
9. 1959 Sestao (Iberia)
10. 1960 Aginaga
11. 1961 Pasai Donibane
12. 1962 Pasai Donibane
13. 1963 Pasai Donibane
14. 1964 Orio
15. 1965 Hondarribia
16. 1966 Hondarribia
17. 1967 Hondarribia
18. 1968 Hondarribia
19. 1969 Lasarte
20. 1970 Orio
21. 1971 Orio
22. 1972 Orio
23. 1973 Lasarte
24. 1974 Orio
25. 1975 Orio
26. 1976 Pedreña
27. 1977 Santurtzi
28. 1978 Sestao (Kaiku)
29. 1979 Santurtzi
30. 1980 Sestao (Kaiku)
31. 1981 Sestao (Kaiku)
32. 1982 Sestao (Kaiku)
33. 1983 Orio
34. 1984 Zumaia
35. 1985 Santurtzi
36. 1986 Pasai Donibane
37. 1987 Zumaia
38. 1988 Pasai Donibane
39. 1989 Pasai San Pedro
40. 1990 Pasai Donibane(Koxtape)
41. 1991 Pasai San Pedro
42. 1992 Orio
43. 1993 Pasai San Pedro
44. 1994 Pasai San Pedro
45. 1995 Pasai Donibane(Donibaneko)
46. 1996 Orio
47. 1997 Orio
48. 1998 Orio
49. 1999 Pasai Donibane(Koxtape)
50. 2000 Orio

=== 2001-date ===
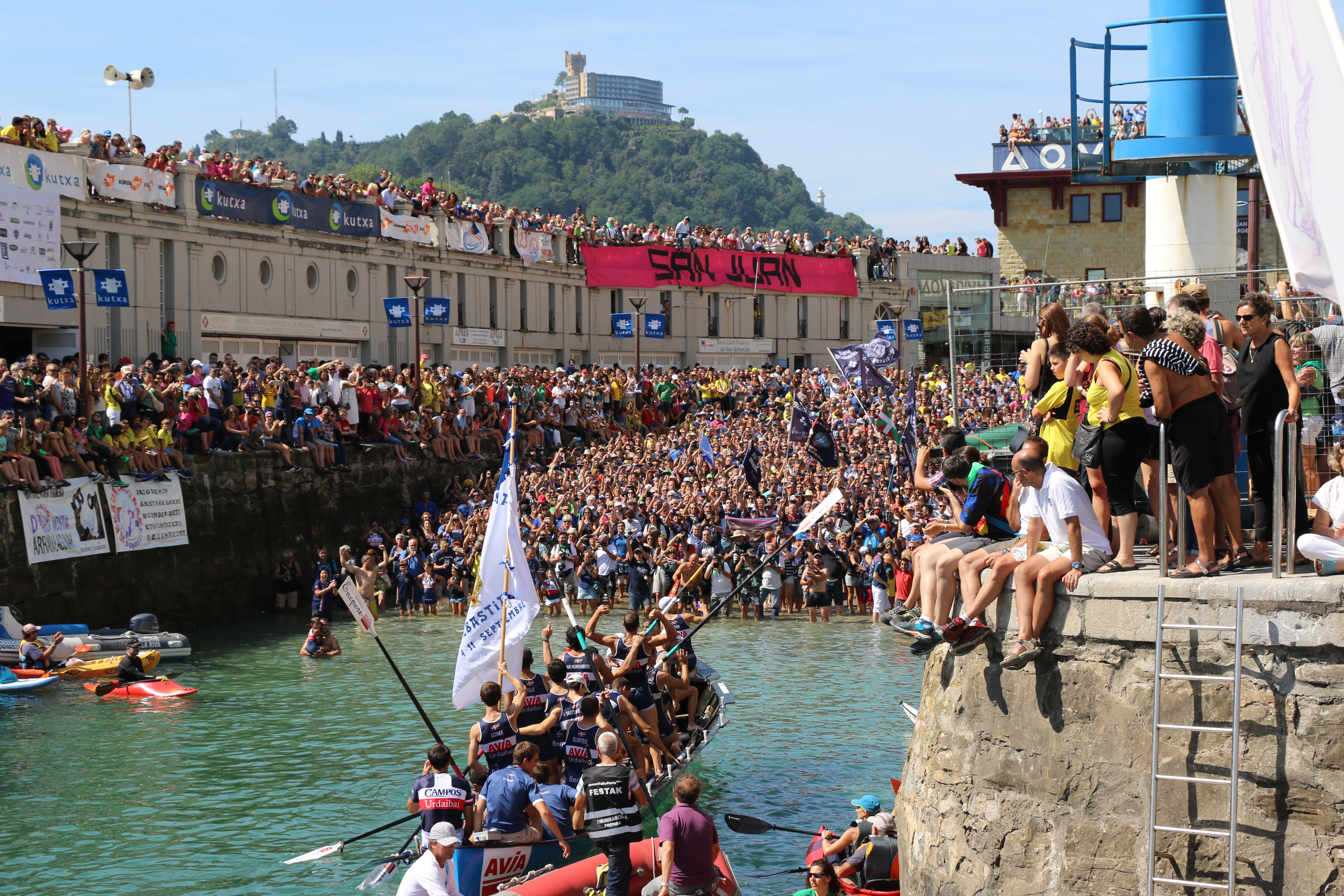
Spectators in 2016

1. 2001 Castro Urdiales
2. 2002 Castro Urdiales
3. 2003 El Astillero (El Astillero)
4. 2004 El Astillero (El Astillero)
5. 2005 Hondarribia
6. 2006 Castro Urdiales
7. 2007 Orio (Orio Arraun Elkartea)
8. 2008 Castro Urdiales
9. 2009 Sestao (Kaiku)
10. 2010 Bermeo (Urdaibai)
11. 2011 Bermeo (Urdaibai)
12. 2012 Sestao (Kaiku)
13. 2013 Hondarribia
14. 2014 Bermeo (Urdaibai)
15. 2015 Bermeo (Urdaibai)
16. 2016 Bermeo (Urdaibai)
17. 2017 Orio (Orio Arraun Elkartea)
18. 2018 Hondarribia
19. 2019 Hondarribia
20. 2020 Hondarribia
21. 2021 Santurtzi
22. 2022 Bermeo (Urdaibai)
23. 2023 Bermeo (Urdaibai)
24. 2024 Bermeo (Urdaibai)
