= Simele District =

Simele District قەزای سێمێل
- District
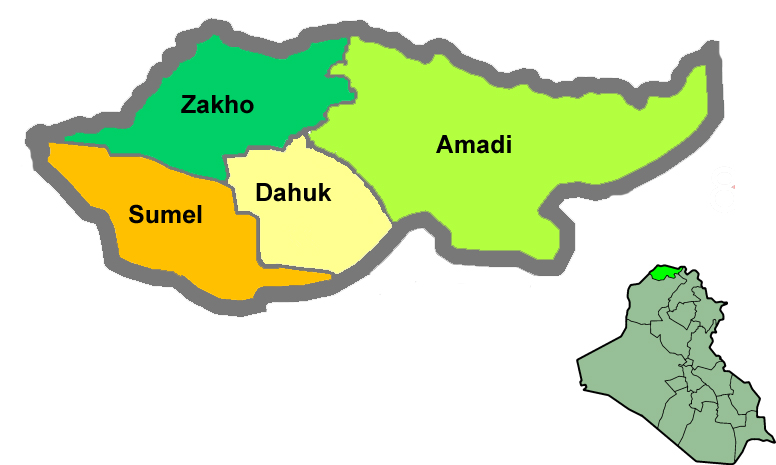

- Location within Iraq
- Country: Iraq
- Region: Kurdistan Region
- Governorate: Dohuk Governorate
- Seat: Simele

Population (2014)
  - Urban: 135,744
  - Rural: 39,740
- Time zone: UTC+3 (AST)
- Area code: +964 62

Simele District (Kurdish: قەزای سێمێل, romanized: Qezaya Sêmêl, Arabic: قضاء سميل, romanized: qaḍāʾ Sumail) is a district of Dohuk Governorate in Kurdistan Region, Iraq. The administrative centre is Simele.

== Subdistricts ==
The district has the following sub-districts:

- Batel
- Fayda
- Simele
