= Albaola Maritime Culture Factory =

Shipyard museum in Gipuzkoa, Spain

Coordinates: 43°19′45″N 1°55′33″W

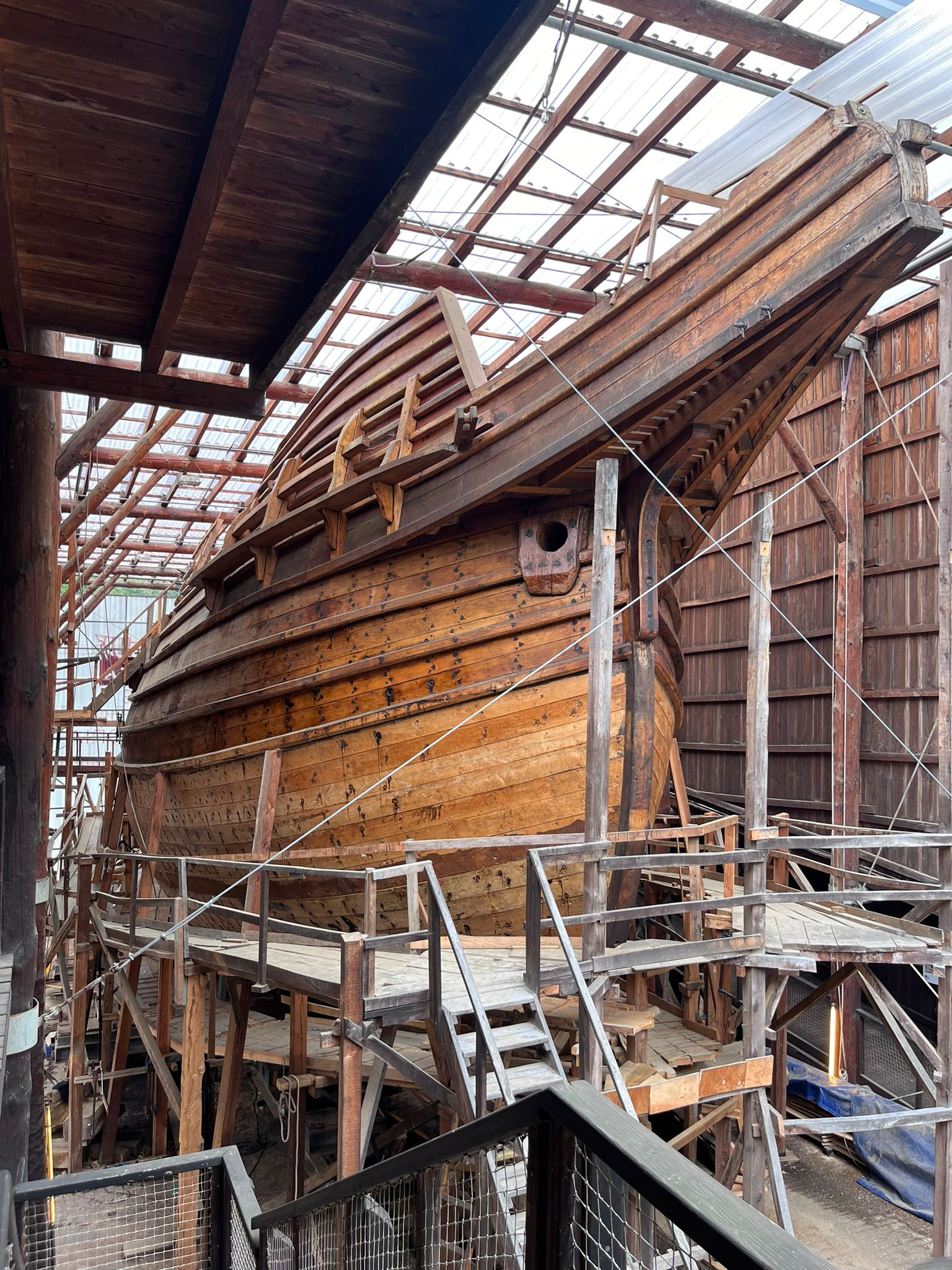
Reconstruction of a traditional Basque whaling boat at the Albaola Maritime Culture Factory

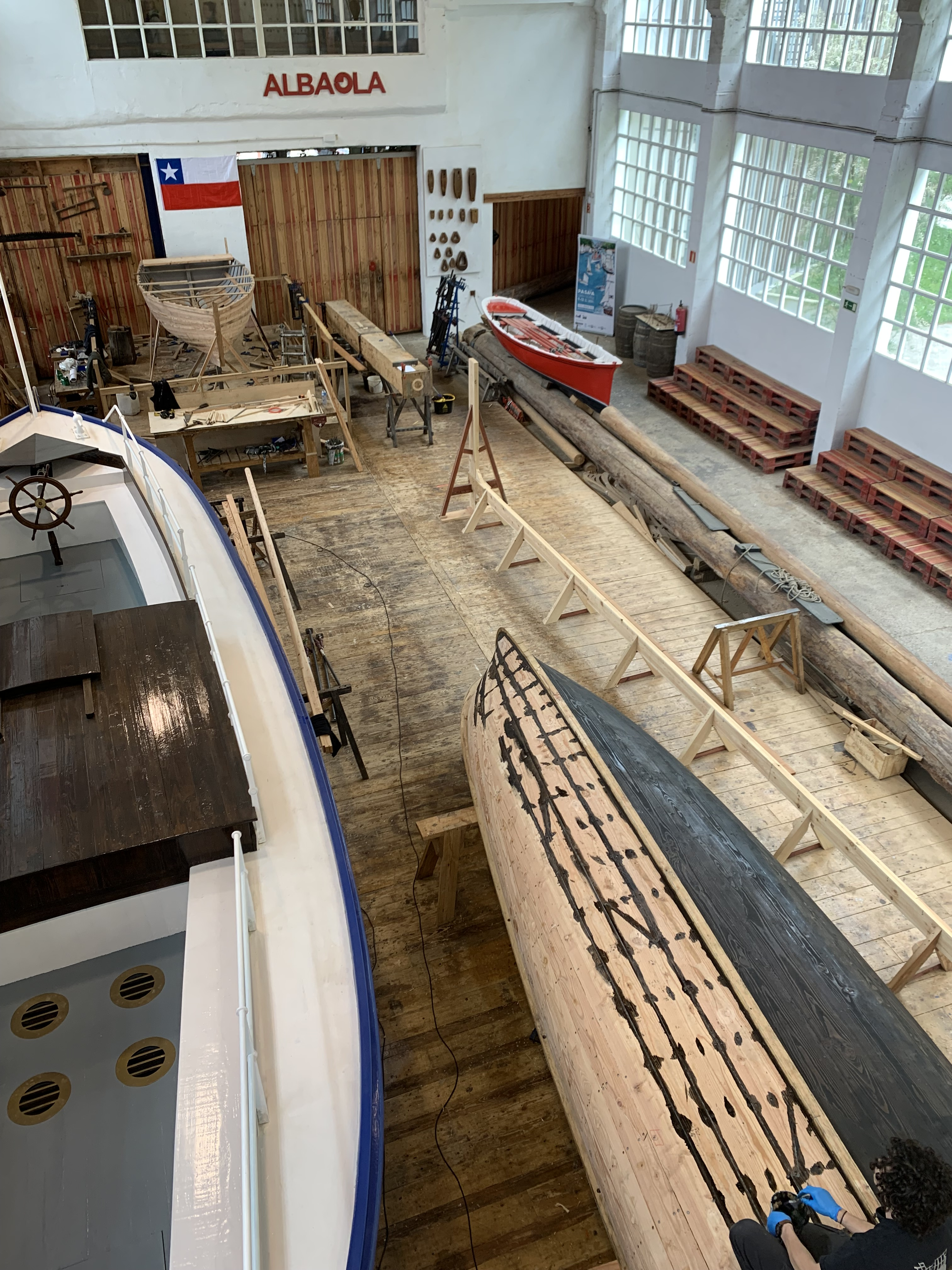
Boat building workshop at the boat building school at the Albaola Maritime Culture Factory

Albaola Maritime Culture Factory is a shipyard museum in Pasaia, Gipuzkoa, Spain. A scientific replica of the San Juan whaleship of the 16th century is being built in public, using the techniques and materials of the time. In 2015 the construction process of the whaleboat obtained UNESCO protection. In 2018 the museum received 63,000 visitors.

At the end of the 20th century, the remains of a Basque ship were found in the harbour at Red Bay, Labrador. After analyzing the remains of the ship and the old documents of Gipuzkoa from those times, they found out that they belonged to the remains of the San Juan whaling ship, which sunk due to a storm in that bay.

By the 16th century, Basque sailors were fishing for whales and cod, and they established advanced fishing posts in Labrador and Newfoundland. The largest of them was in Red Bay: it had around 900 people, and 15 whaleboats traveled every year. The remains of the San Juan whaleship were found in that bay. Today, in the town of Red Bay, there is the Museum of Basque Whalers, which displays a boat recovered from the San Juan whaling ship.

The remains of the San Juan whaleship were found in that bay. Today, in the town of Red Bay, there is the Museum of Basque Whalers, which displays a boat recovered from the San Joan whaling ship.

The Albaola Association was founded by Xabier Agot in 1997 in America. At The Rockland Apprenticeshop in Maine, a 16th-century Basque fishing trainer was built between January and May 1998. When being brought back to the Basque Country, the trainer traveled from port to port for 29 days, each stage with local rowers (350 in total). It was then that the Albaola association was created, an organization that would receive and take care of the trainer's donation had to be created.

He later studied the remains found in Red Bay and promoted the project of making a replica of the San Juan whaler, the vestige of the Basque whaling boat, in the Red Bay museum. The Apaizac Obeto expedition was organized in Canada in 2006 to recover the traces left by Basque whalers in Newfoundland and along the St. Lawrence River. They sailed in a traditional trainer called a Beothuk. It was a replica of the old whaling boat found by Canadian marine archaeologists in the cold waters of Labrador, built-in Pasaia by members of the Albaola association. In 2006 Jon Maia published a book chronicling the expedition, and in 2011 he directed a documentary film.
