= Batel =

Village in Iraq

- Village
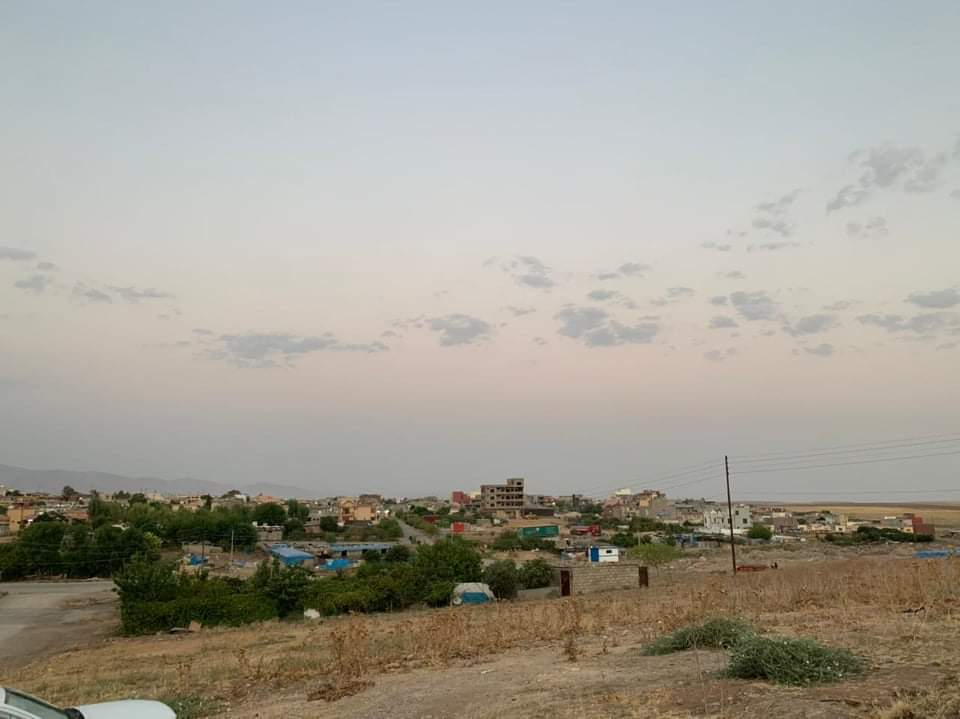

- Location in Iraq Batel (Iraqi Kurdistan)
- Coordinates: 36.959572°N 42.680654°E
- Country: Iraq
- Region: Kurdistan Region
- Governorate: Dohuk Governorate
- District: Simele District
- Sub-district: Batel

Population (2014)
  - Urban: 2,083
  - Rural: 19,625

Batel (Arabic: باتيل, romanized: Bātil, Kurdish: باتێل, romanized: Batêl) is a village and sub-district in Dohuk Governorate in Kurdistan Region, Iraq. It is located in the Simele District.

== Gallery ==
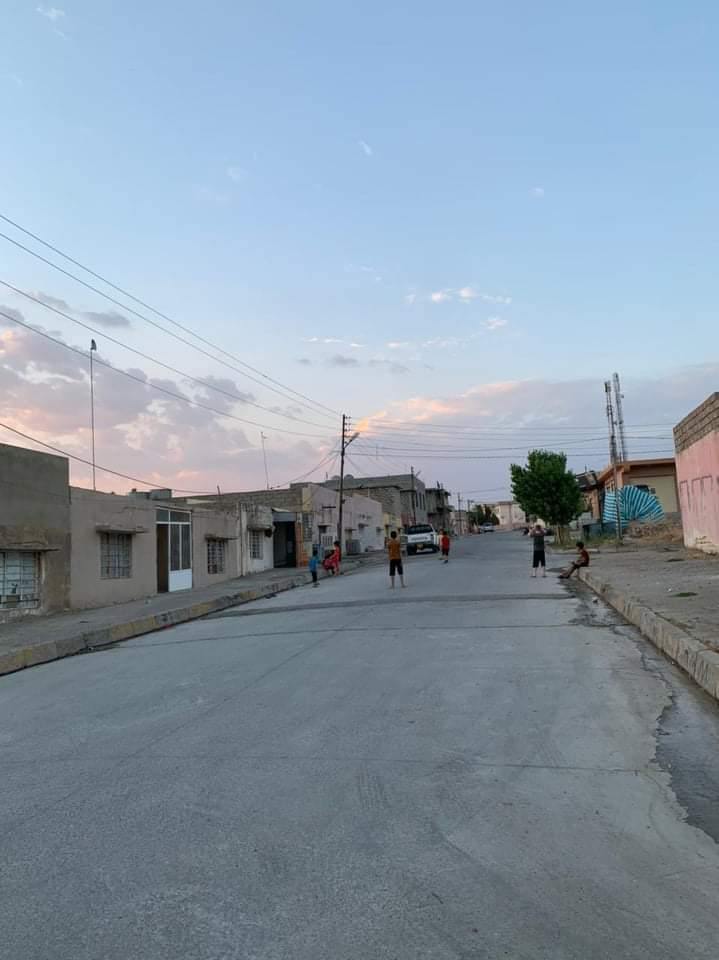
Batel

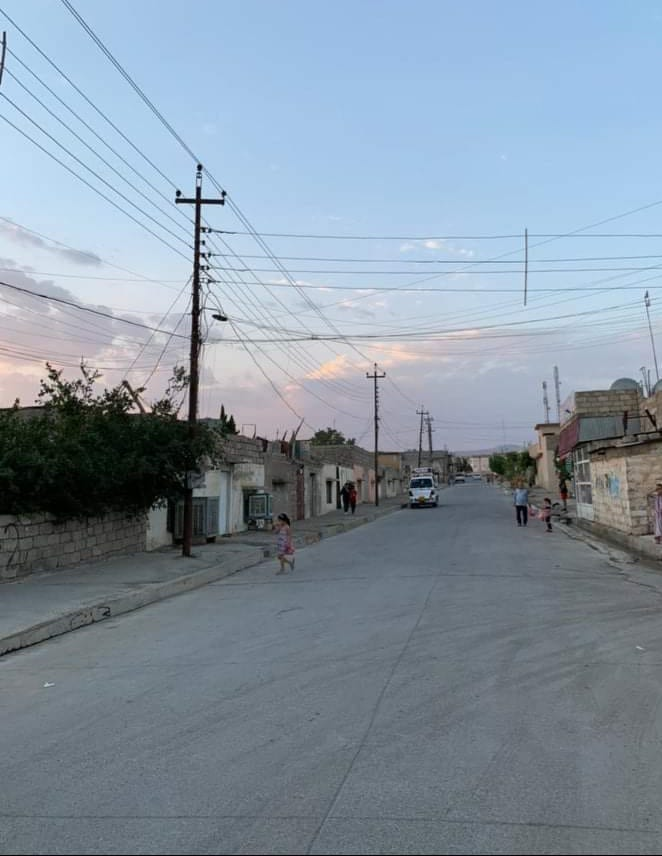
Batel

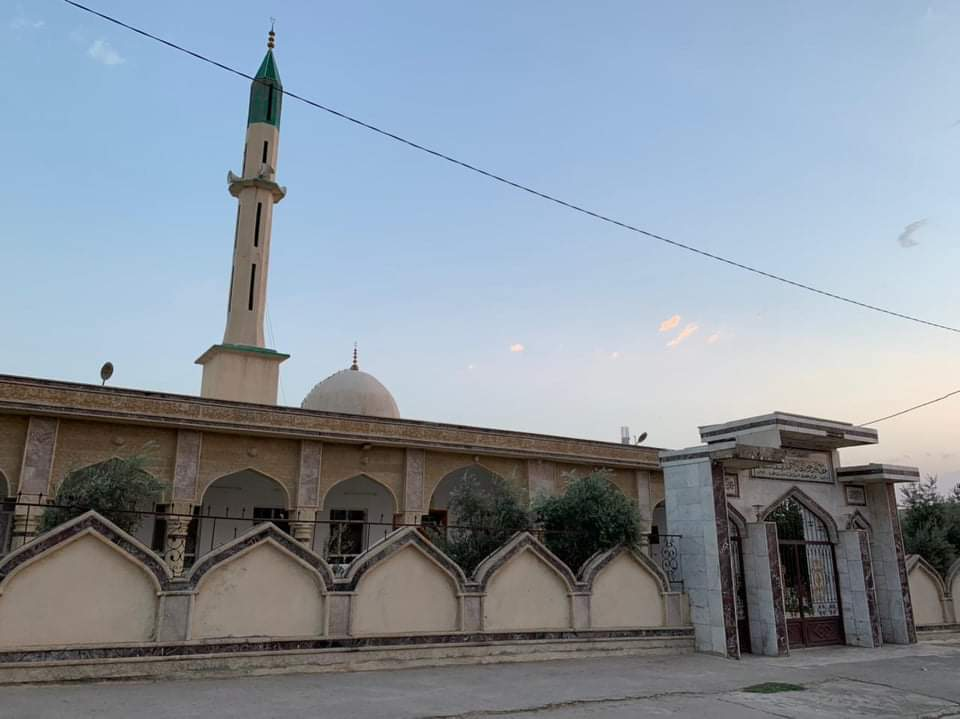
Mosque in Batel

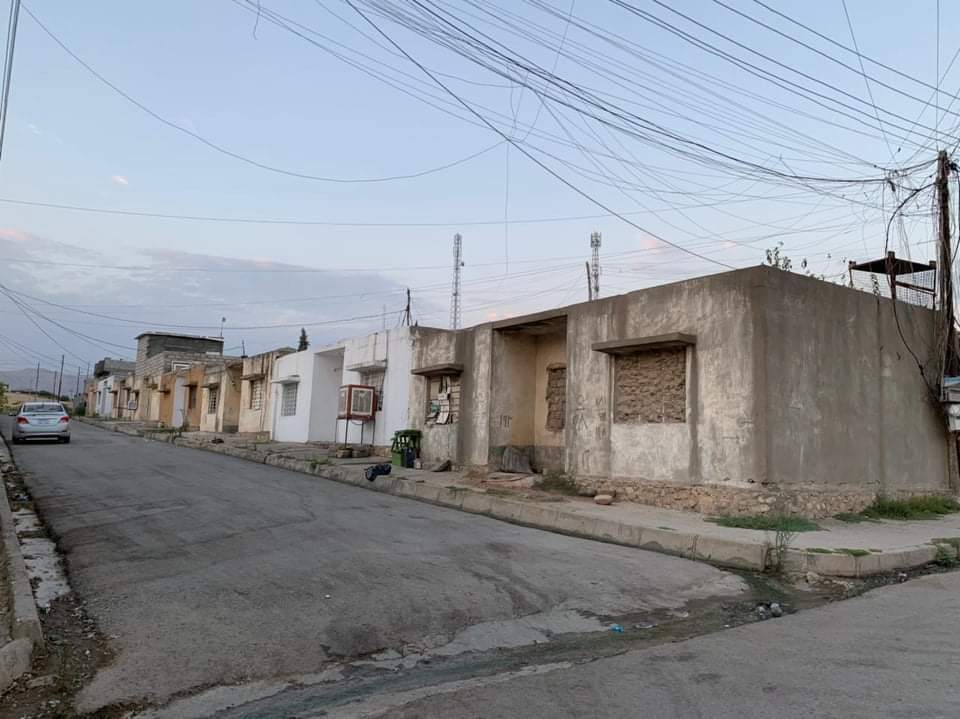
Batel
