= Pasaia =

Pasaia Pasajes
- Municipality
- Pasaia
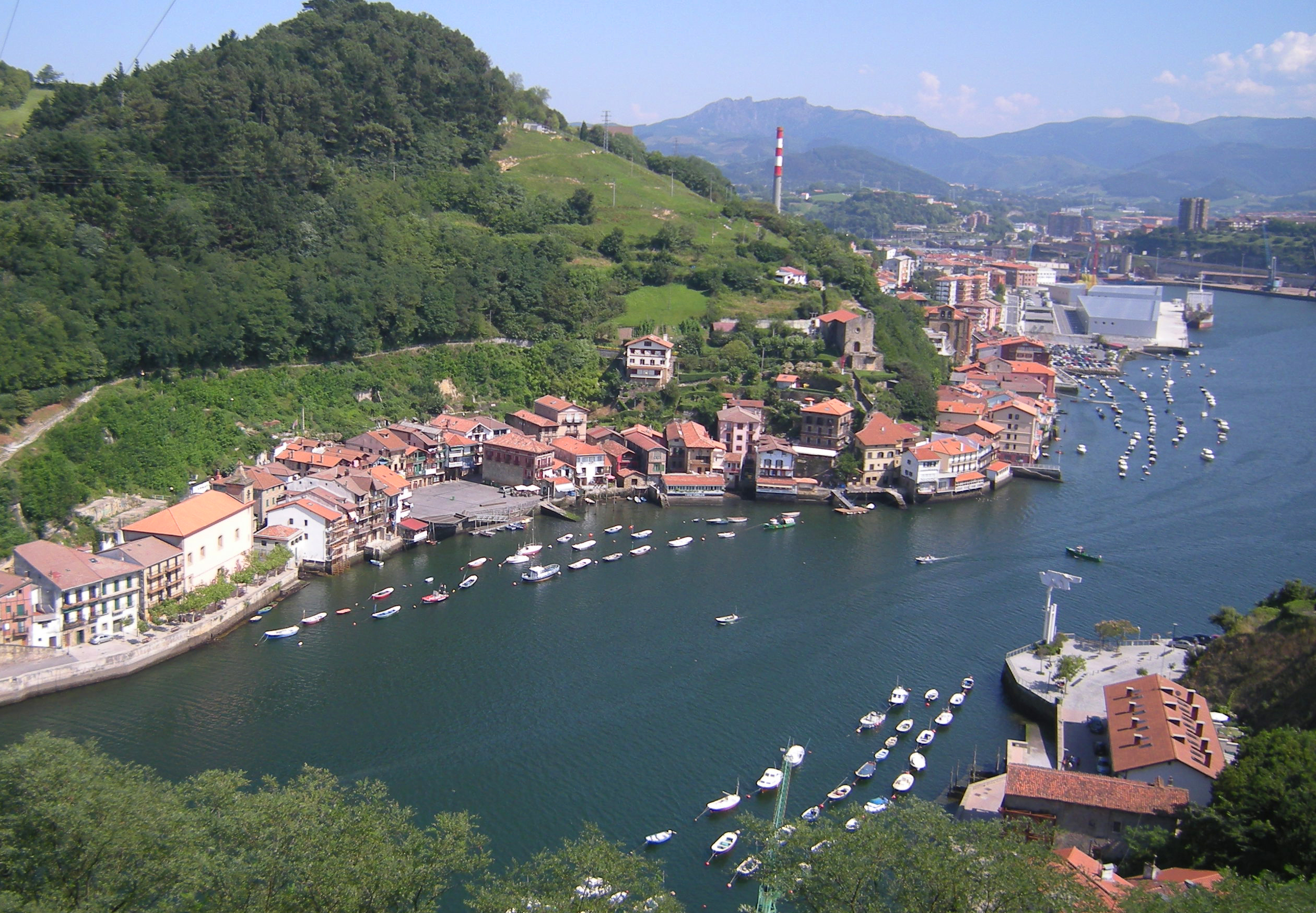
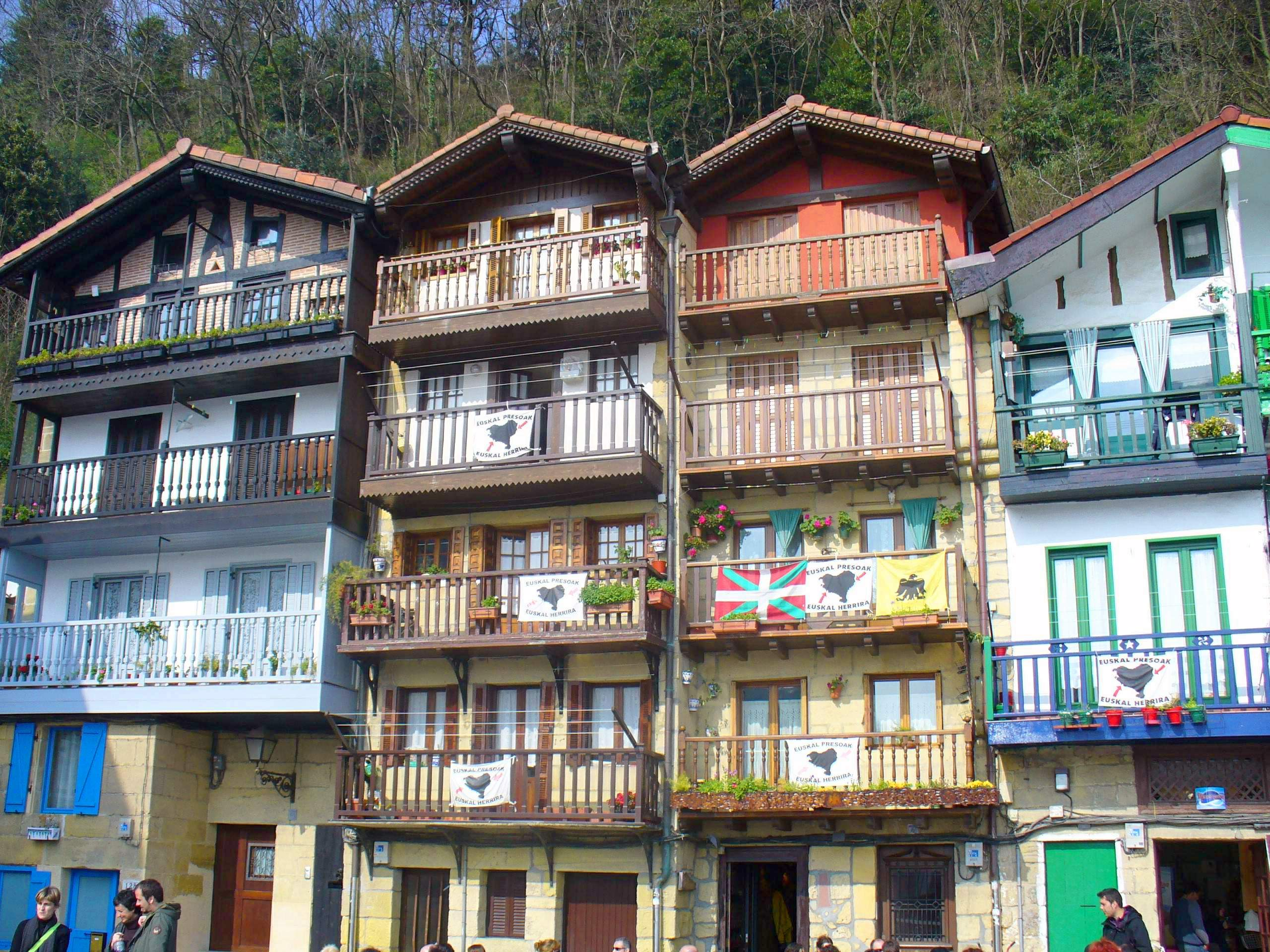
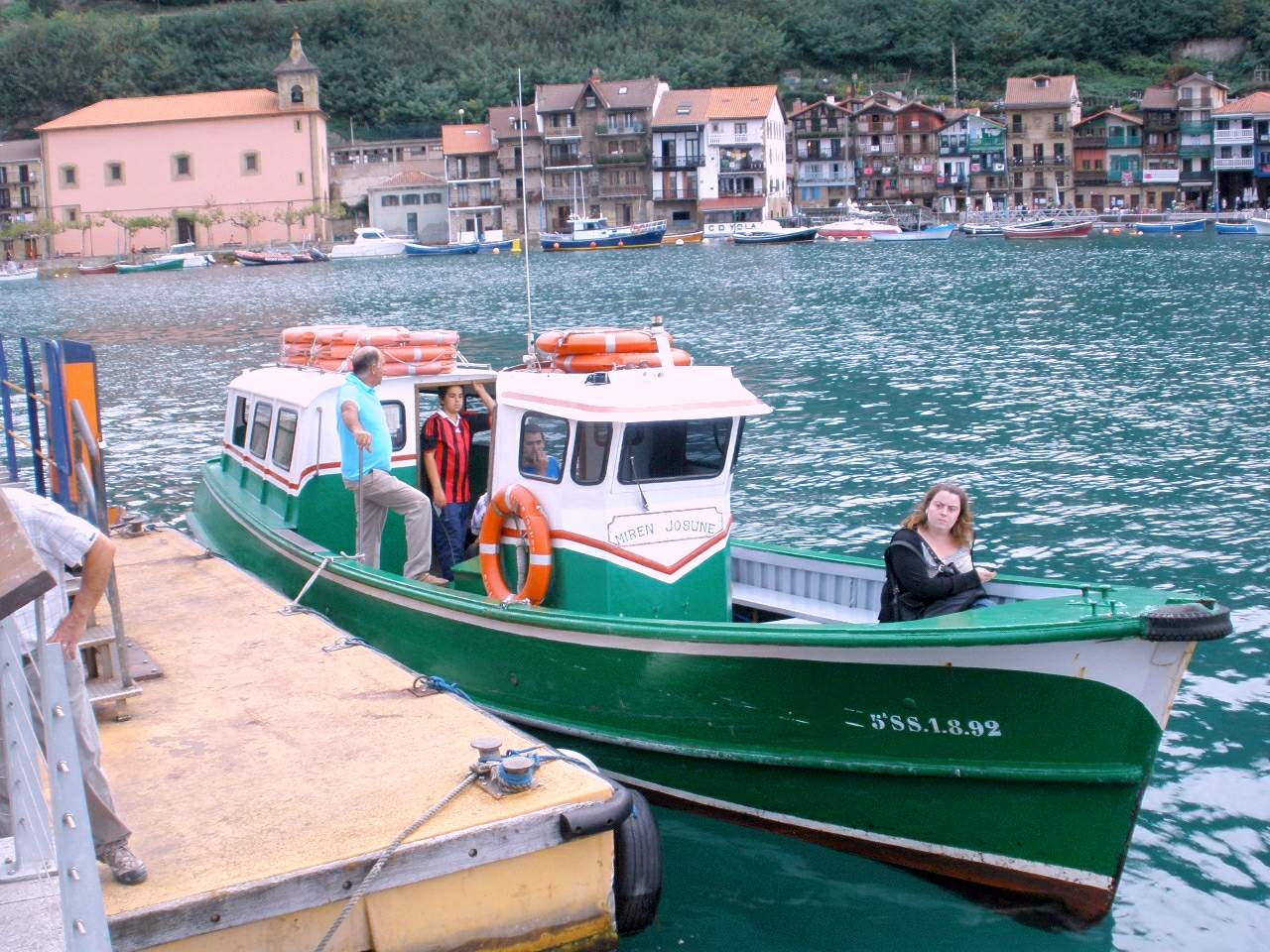
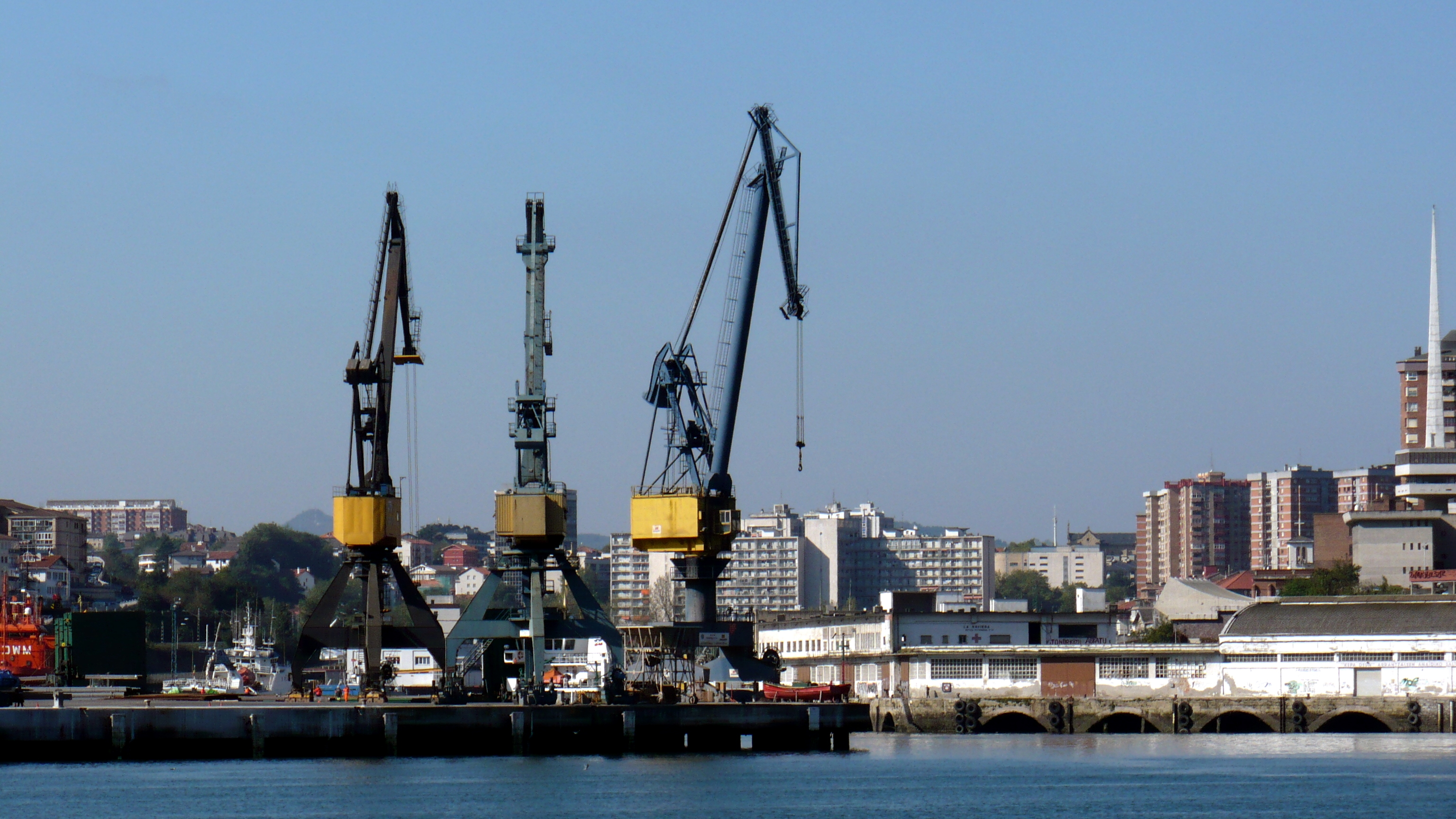
- Pasaia

- Location of Pasaia within the Basque Autonomous Community Location of Pasaia within Spain
- Coordinates: 43°19′31″N 1°55′16″W
- Country: Spain
- Autonomous community: Basque Country
- Province: Gipuzkoa
- Eskualdea: Donostialdea

Government
  - Mayor: Izaskun Gómez Cermeño (PSE-EE)

Area
  - Total: 11.34 km^{2} (4.38 sq mi)

Population (2025-01-01)
  - Total: 15,820
  - Density: 1,395/km^{2} (3,613/sq mi)
- Demonym: Pasaitarra
- Time zone: UTC+1 (CET)
  - Summer (DST): UTC+2 (CEST)
- Postal code: 20110
- Official language(s): Basque, Spanish
- Website: pasaia.eus

Pasaia (Spanish: Pasajes) is a town and municipality located in the province of Gipuzkoa in the Basque Autonomous Community of northern Spain. It is a fishing community, commercial port, and the birthplace of the famous admiral Blas de Lezo and the fashion designer Paco Rabanne.

Pasaia lies approximately 5 kilometres (3.1 mi) east of San Sebastián's centre, lying at the foot of Mount Ulia and the Jaizkibel massif. The municipality numbers 16,056 inhabitants (as of 2008 estimates), clustering around the Bay of Pasaia in four nuclei, namely Pasai San Pedro, Pasai San Juan (or Donibane in Basque), Pasai Antxo, and Trintxerpe, with each part showing distinctive features.

== History ==
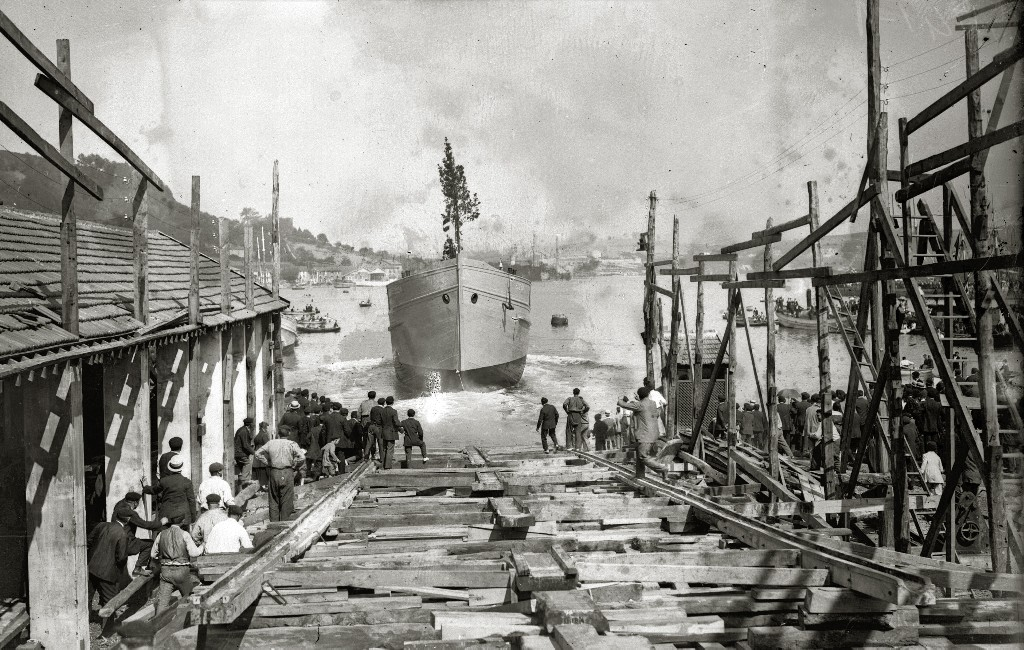
Launch of a ship at the San Roque shipyards, Pasaia (1920)

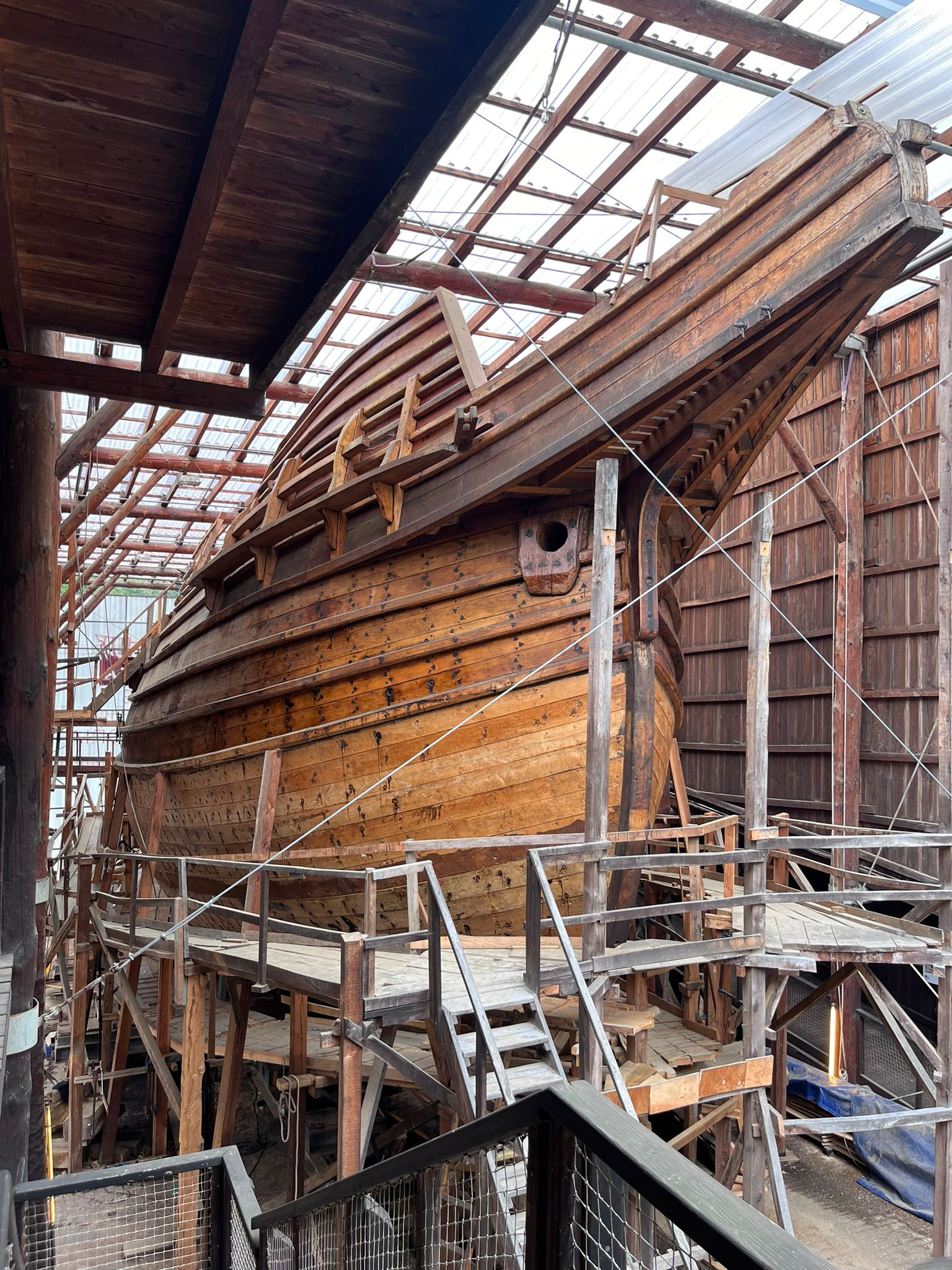
Reconstruction of a traditional Basque whaling boat at the Albaola Maritime Culture Factory in Pasaia

The first documented mention of this place, written in 1203, calls it Oiarso. The name was later changed to "Pasage" (first attested in the 15th century), which means 'port' in Gascon. Gascons had come to inhabit the area side by side with the Basque people at the beginning of the 13th century.

It was a major source of revenue for the municipal coffers on the strength of its position on commercial sea routes. The Guipuzcoana Company used this as its main port, and there were as many as seven shipyards here in the mid-17th century. Historically, the area was controlled by two competing baronies: Hondarribia, controlling Donibane, the right bank; and San Sebastián, with jurisdiction over San Pedro, the left bank. Donibane separated from Hondarribia in 1770, and San Pedro separated from San Sebastián in 1805.

The district of Antxo was formed in 1890, when the Irun-Madrid railway came through. Trintxerpe, next to San Pedro, was the last district to form. Trintxerpe and Antxo eventually became a continuous urban strip with the eastern districts of San Sebastián.
