= Santa Clara Island (San Sebastián) =

Island in San Sebastian, Spain

Coordinates: 43.3214°N 1.9989°W

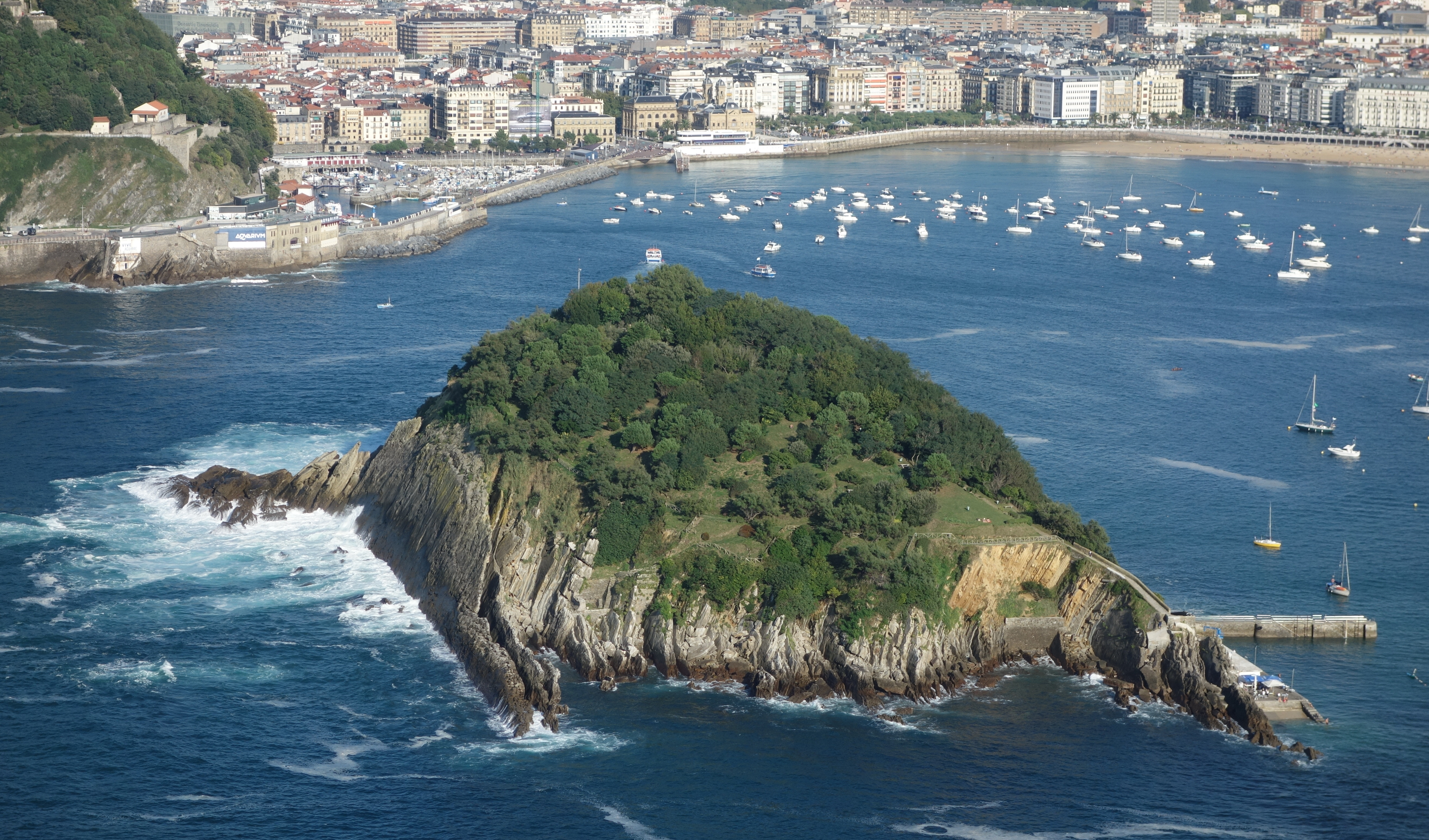
Seen from the hill Igeldo

Santa Clara Island (Spanish: Isla de Santa Clara; Basque: Santa Klara uhartea) is an island located in San Sebastián, Spain, in the middle of the La Concha Bay. It is located between the two most important mountains of the city, Urgull and Igueldo.

It measures 400 metres (1,300 feet) across, and rises to a height of 48 metres (157 feet), with steep sides. The island has a small beach which only appears at low tide. There is a small bar and a small port. Despite the small size of the island, the beach has a lifeguard service because of its popularity in the summer. The concrete pier of Santa Clara is served by boat from San Sebastián, running once per hour during working hours depending on the season. The island has an uninhabited lighthouse.

== Wildlife and plants ==
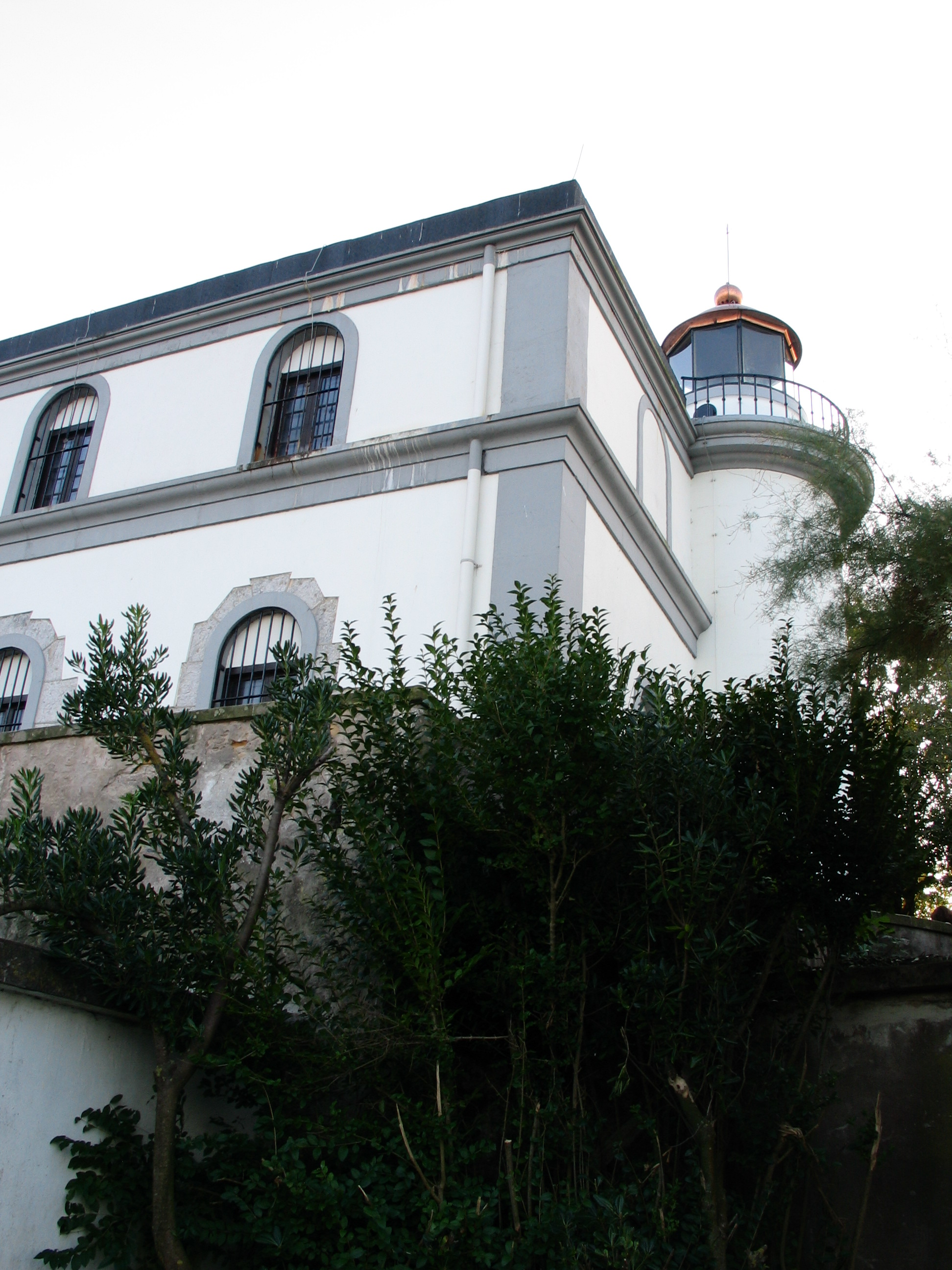
Lighthouse on Santa Clara

The island supports a range of exotic species including:

- Tamarix gallica (French tamarisk)
- Chamaecyparis lawsoniana (Lawson's cypress)
- Arundo donax (giant cane)
- Populus nigra (black poplar)
- Betula celtiberica (birch)
- Ficus carica (common fig)
- Robinia pseudoacacia (black locust tree)
- Ligustrum ovalifolium (oval-leaved privet)
- Euonymus japonicus (Japanese spindle)
- Geranium robertianum (herb Robert)
- Pteridium aquilinum (common bracken)
- Trifolium reptans (clover)
- Crithmum maritimum (rock samphire)

Animals include the Iberian wall lizard (Podarcis hispanicus sebastiani) as well as gulls, the European shag (Phalacrocorax aristotelis) and the common guillemot (Uria aalge) .

== History ==
At the end of the 16th century, the people of San Sebastián who were infected by the plague were transferred to the island to prevent the spread of infection. The island of Santa Clara is state property, transferred by the state to the commune of San Sebastián under the Decree of October 31, 1968.

== See also ==
- List of islands of Spain
