= La Concha Bay =

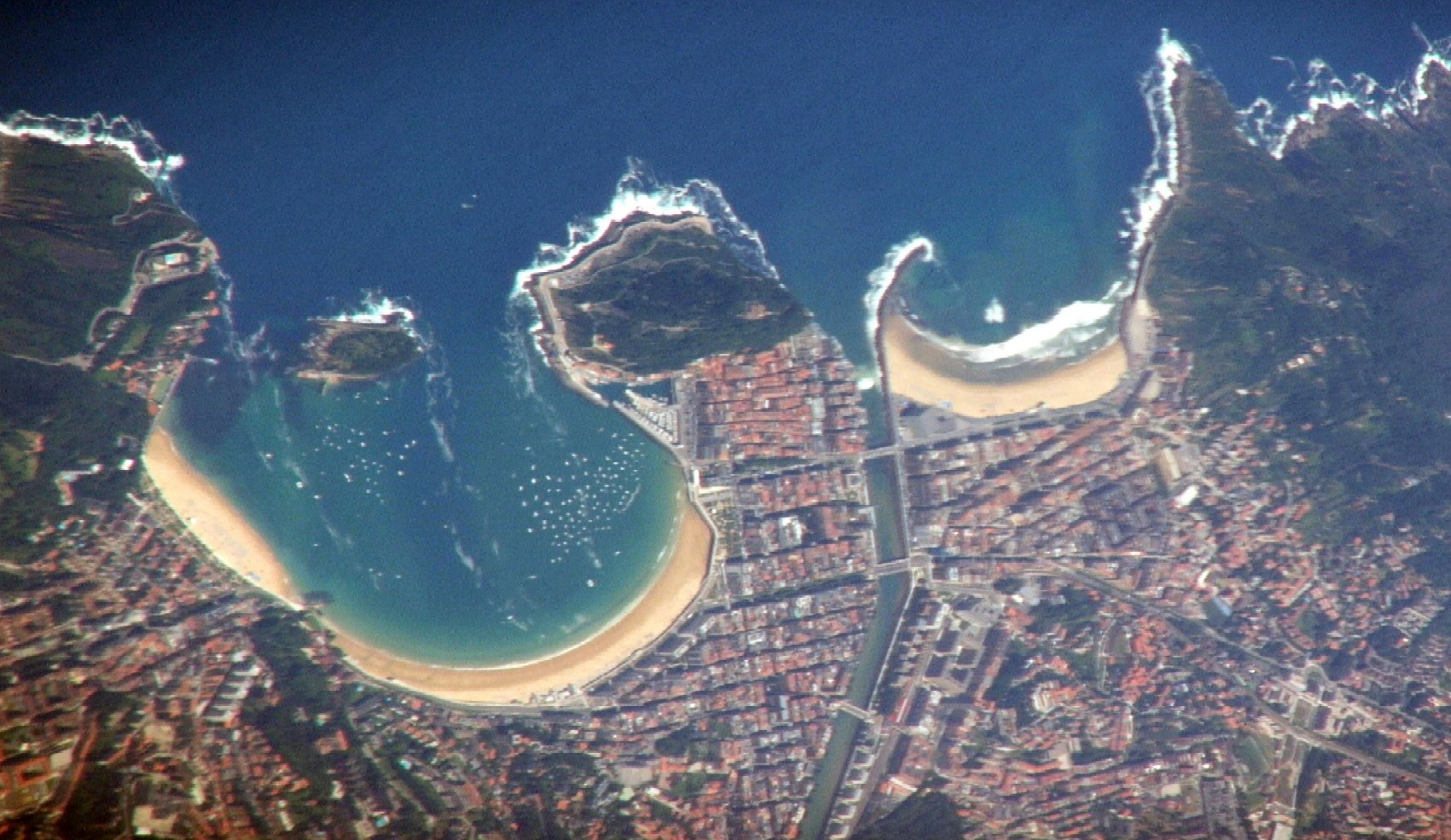
- Satellite image of San Sebastián: On the right Zurriola Beach, the city split by the Urumea River, and to the left La Concha Bay and its two beaches.

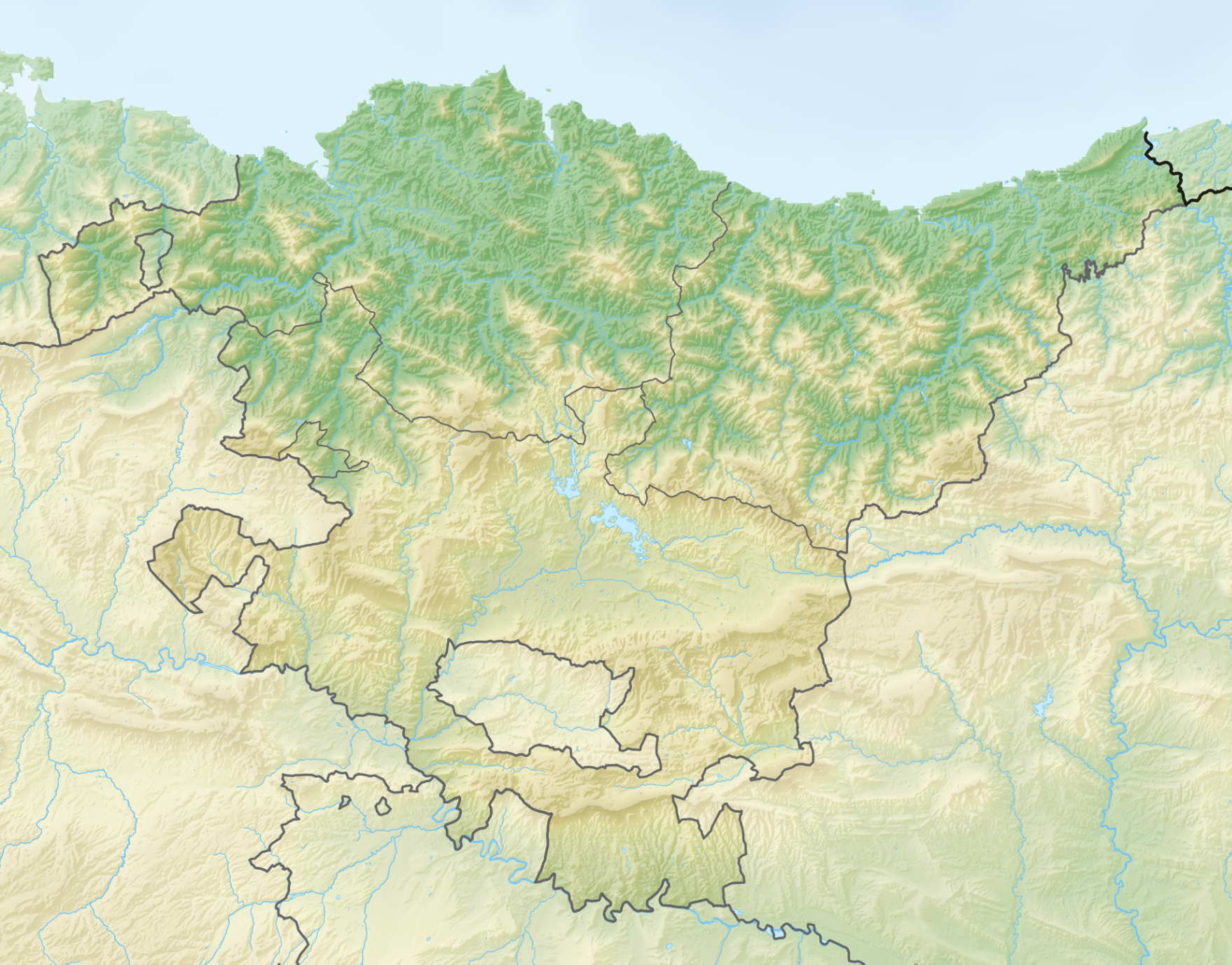
- Location of the Bay (Map of Basque Country)
- Location: San Sebastián
- Coordinates: 43°19′10″N 1°59′44″W
- Type: Bay
- Basin countries: Spain
- Max. length: 0.9 km (0.56 mi)
- Max. width: 1 km (0.62 mi)
- Settlements: San Sebastián

La Concha Bay is a small bay situated on the Spanish coast that separates the city of the San Sebastián from the Cantabrian Sea. The name "La Concha" means "The Shell" as in Seashell in Spanish, referring to the general shape of the bay. The bay is home to La Concha Beach, Ondarreta Beach, and Santa Clara Island.

== Geological origin ==
The bay occupies the space between mount Igueldo (west) and mount Urgull (east). According to geological studies, the bay originally extended from mount Igueldo to mount Ulía, which forms the eastern border of Zurriola Beach, since in all likelihood mount Urgull could have been an island. Therefore, the ancient bay, with a coastline more than 3000 meters long, contained all three of the city's beaches and two islands. Later, with the sediment that accumulated at the mouth of the Urumea River, a small isthmus was formed that connected Urgull island to the mainland, converting it into a mountain. This was how the current bay formed, whose shell shape would be solidified with the construction of the esplanade.

== Beaches ==
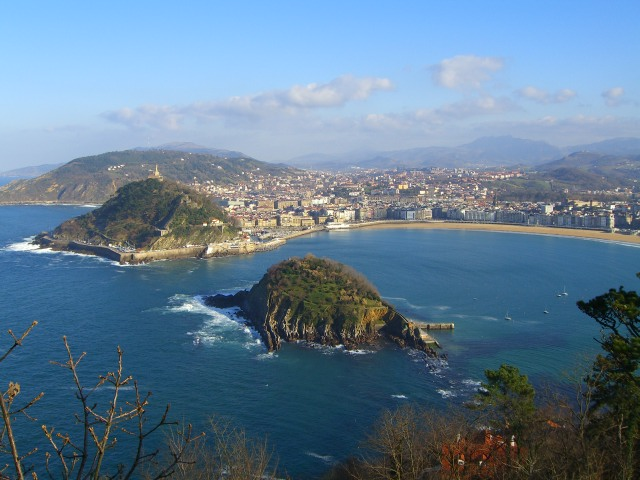
La Concha Bay from mount Igueldo.

The city's beaches have a combined length of approximately 2000 meters, 1400 of which correspond to the La Concha Beach and the remaining 600 to Ondarreta Beach. While tidal changes are frequent and greatly affect the width of the beaches, these changes only last a few hours. Santa Clara Island is slightly more than 1000 meters from La Concha Beach and is reachable by ferry.

== Promenade ==
The promenade that borders La Concha Bay is composed of various sections with distinct names. Beginning from the east around the aquarium, this section hugs the hillside of mount Urgull and would eventually be given the name Paseo Nuevo. Continuing west, the walk runs through the city's small fishing port, and later, and at the base of the Town Hall building, La Concha promenade begins. Along the promenade and extending to the end of the bay is the famous La Concha railing, designed by Juan Rafael Alday and installed in the 1910s. This section of the promenade contains the most outstanding architectural and ornamental elements that border the bay: some characteristic street lamps located at the beginning of the down ramp to the La Concha Beach, two large clocks, the buildings of La Perla spa, and the Royal Bath House. Further west, the beachfront reaches Paseo de Miraconcha, which ends at Miramar Palace. Between Miramar and The Comb of the Wind sculptures, the promenade is called Paseo de Ondarreta reflecting Ondarreta Beach which it borders. The promenade comes to an end at the edge of the bay with the collection of sculptures called The Comb of the Wind, designed by sculptor Eduardo Chillida, who is from San Sebastian and whose museum reopened in April 2019.

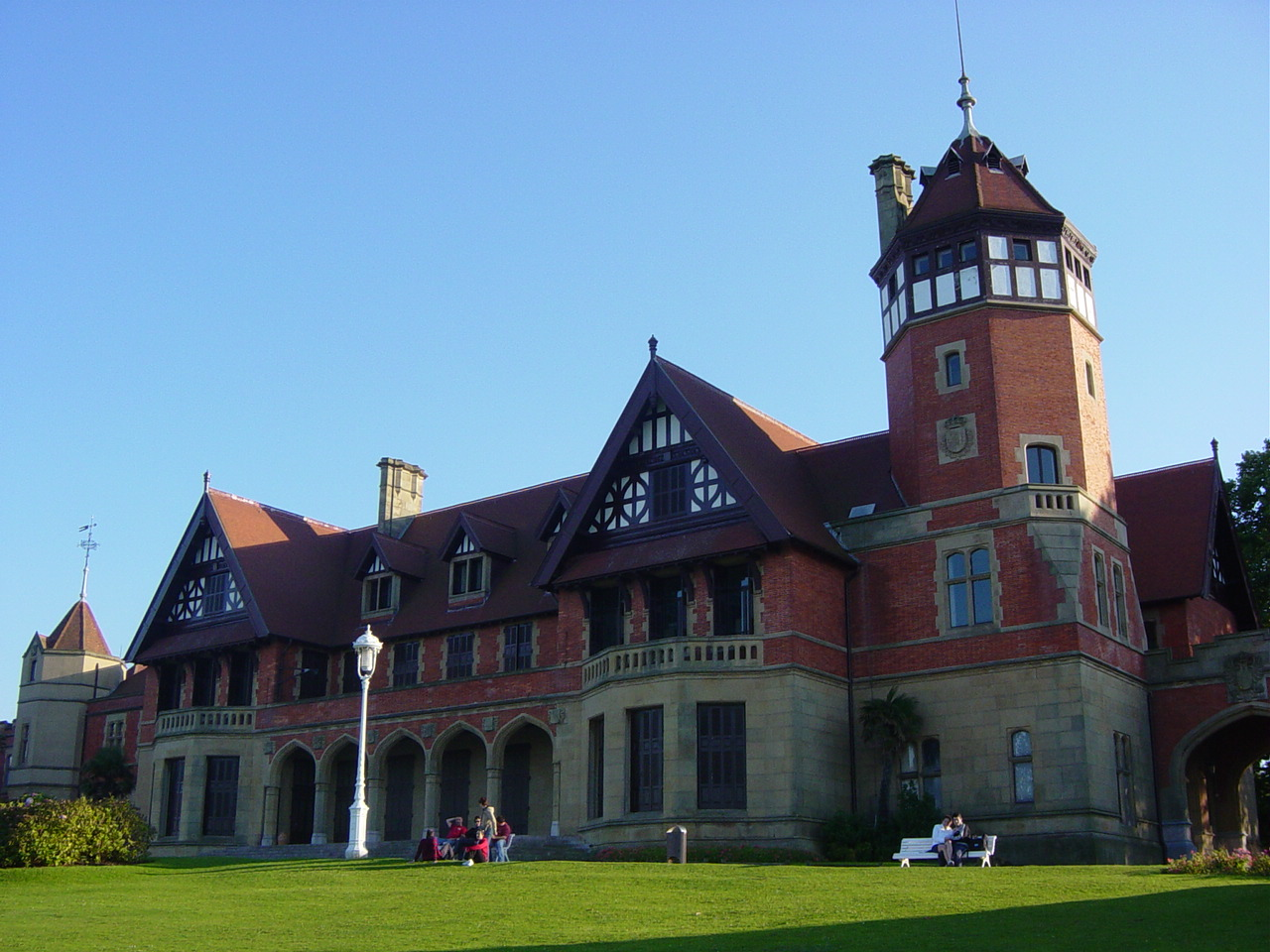
Miramar Palace is located in the heart of the promenade that borders the bay and separates Ondarreta Beach from La Concha Beach.

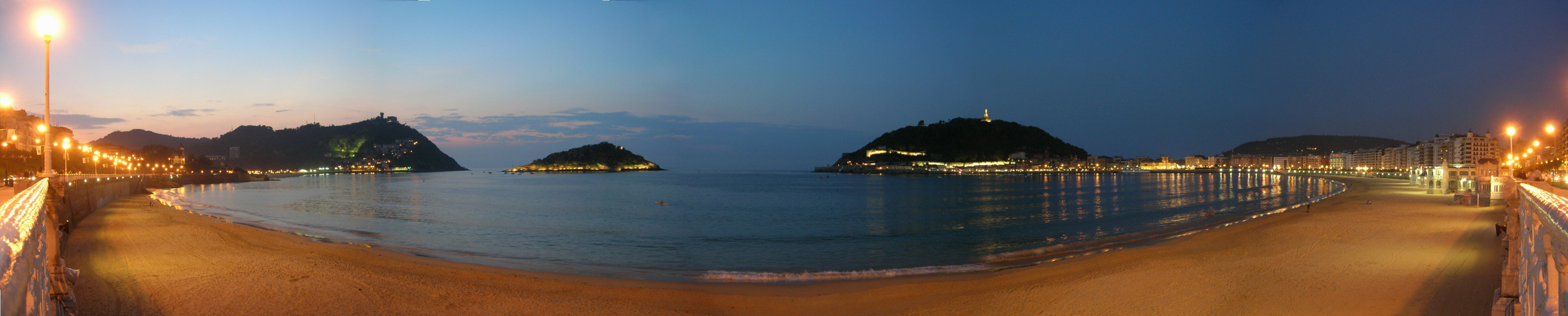
Night view of the bay from La Concha promenade.

== See also ==
- San Sebastián
- La Concha Beach
- Mount Urgull
- Santa Clara Island
