= La Mota Castle =

La Mota Castle may refer to castles in Spain:

- La Mota Castle (Medina del Campo), a fortress in the province of Valladolid
- La Mota Castle (San Sebastián), a fortress in the province of Gipuzkoa
