= La Mota Castle (San Sebastián) =

Castle in San Sebastián, Spain

- San Sebastián in Spain
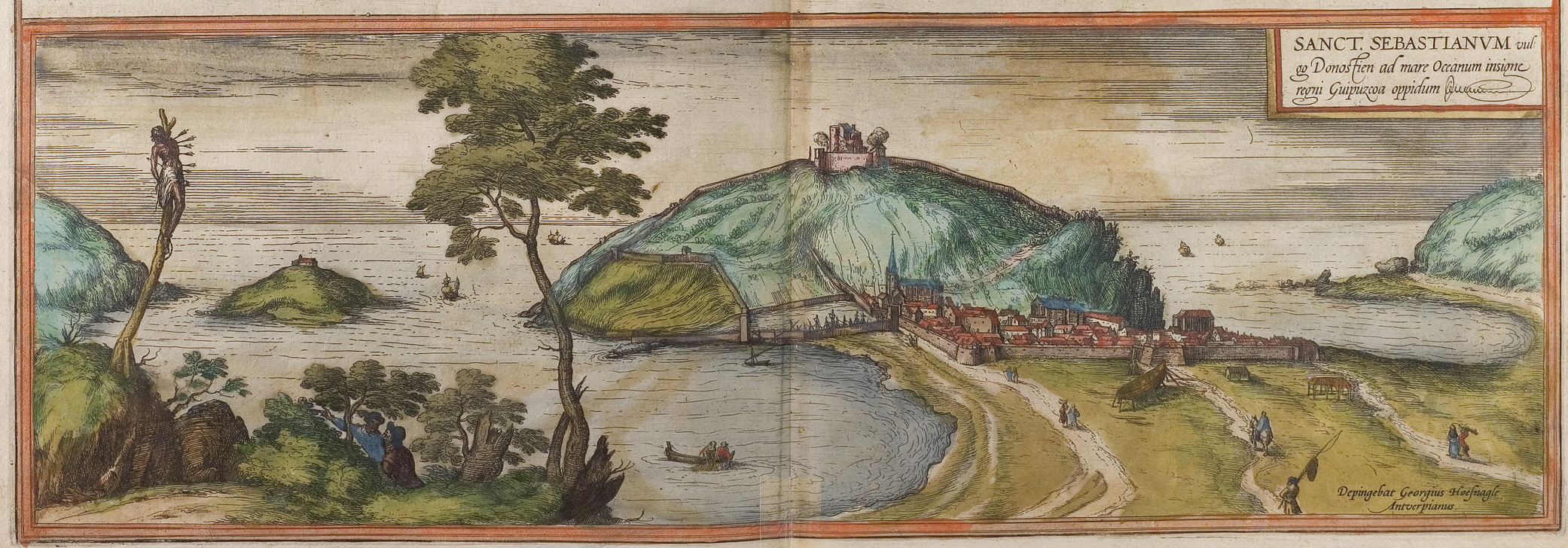
- San Sebastián with La Mota Castle on the hilltop of Mount Urgull, by Georg Braun and Frans Hogenberg: Civitates Orbis Terrarum, Band 1, 1572. Universitätsbibliothek Heidelberg

Site information
- Owner: City Council of San Sebastián (since 1921)

Location
- Coordinates: 43.325°N 1.989°W

Site history
- In use: Late 11th century – 19th century
- Events: Siege of San Sebastián (1719); Siege of San Sebastián (1813)

La Mota Castle (Castillo de la Mota, Castillo de Santa Cruz de la Mota or Castillo del Santo Christo de la Mota) is an old fortress strategically located on the hilltop of Mount Urgull (Monte Orgullo), in San Sebastián, Spain. The city itself was built at the foot of Mount Urgull, a hill (mota) at the end of a peninsula.

Apart from its location, the castle's primary defences were its thick walls (with access at three points, including to the keep, using drawbridges) and, over time, its integration with the city's overall fortifications. Official documents often refer only to the main buildings of the castle itself but sometimes also include the whole of Mount Urgull when referring to the castle. Much of the current structure of the castle dates from between 1863 and 1866, and further restoration work was carried out in 1965.

The castle was first declared a monument of architectural and artistic interest in 1925, and since then has been subjected different levels of protection, the latest being declared a Monumento Históricoartístico de Carácter Nacional (national monument) in 1984.

== History ==
=== 11th to 12th centuries ===
The castle is thought to have been constructed originally in 1194 by the King of Navarre, Sancho the Strong (1194–1234), over a simpler construction, possibly little more than a watchtower, built in the previous century by Sancho the Great of Navarra (1000-1035). In any case, it was included on the list of Navarran fortresses that were transferred to the King of Castile in 1200.

=== 16th century ===
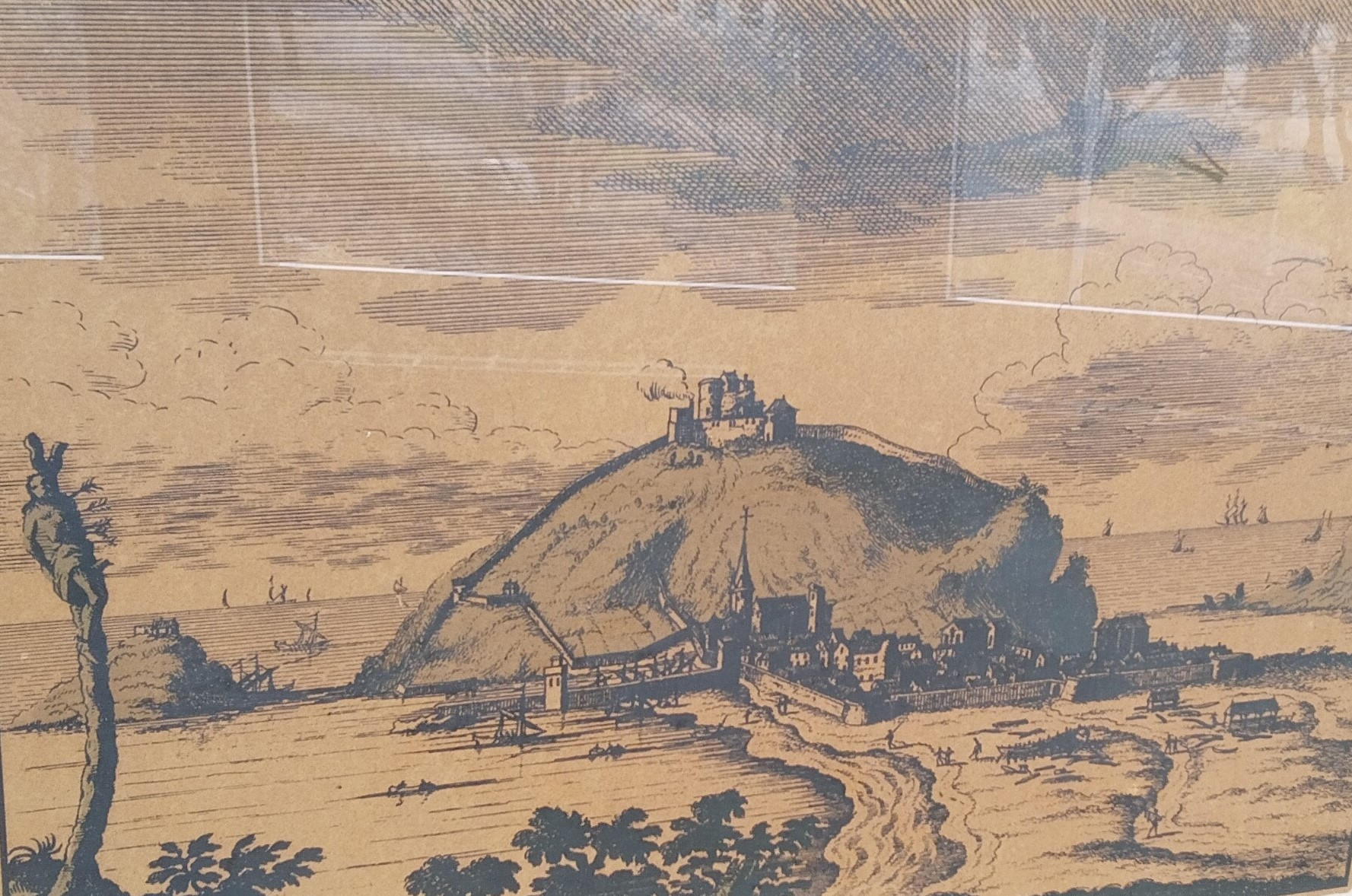
Illustration by Joris Hoefnagel of San Sebastián in the mid 16th century. The ramparts proposed by the governor, Villaturiel, had been completed by 1554.

From the beginning of the 16th century, and throughout the first half of that century, there had been talk of greatly enlarging the castle to six bastions and five curtain walls.

In 1520, Charles V, Holy Roman Emperor, ordered the restoration of the ruined castle. The works were carried out according to the plans drawn up by Gabriele Tadino di Martinengo, recently appointed Capitán General de la Artillería de España y Aragón, in 1524. In 1526, a large semi-circular bastion, known as the "cubo de la Reina" ["the Queen's bastion"] (named after Joanna of Castile (Note: Some 20 years earlier, Joanna of Castile, popularly known as "Juana la loca" ["Mad Joanna"], had been withheld by her mother, Queen Isabella, at the Castle of La Mota, in Medina del Campo, and was said to stand outside in the cold on the bastion of that castle, distraught, in the hope that her husband, Prince Philip the Handsome, who had died suddenly, would return.)) was added to the south face of the "Macho", the keep. In 1535, another bastion was added to the castle and at the gate to the docks.

In 1541, the governor of the castle, Captain Francisco de Villaturiel, who had been sent there in 1535 to oversee the works, wrote that while a lot of money had been spent on the necessary fortifications, it made little sense that these were badly guarded and therefore requested 100 soldiers to defend the city and its castle. That same year, the captain general of Guipúzcoa, Sancho de Leyva reported that Villaturiel only had a garrison of ten troops at San Sebastián, with old artillery pieces and arquebuses without ammunition.

In 1542, Charles V ordered the construction of the "cubo Imperial" ("Imperial bastion"), probably projected by Luis Pizano, to replace the existing heart-shaped defensive structure to the town, and incorporated two bastions (Ingente and Gobernador) on either side of it, to make up what was known as the "frente real" ("royal front") to protect it from attacks coming from the south, or landward face.

In February 1546, Villaturiel himself, wrote to the Prince, the future King Philip II, proposing that the city walls be extended up to the castle and with ramparts extending to the east and west down the slopes as he was concerned that a possible disembarkation from the French ships that were patrolling those waters and if the invading force were able to reach the castle, the city itself would be lost. The sketch Villaturiel attached is one of the oldest known plans of the city.

The ramparts Villaturiel proposed were built between 1548 and 1554 and were just over four metres high and almost 1,5 metres thick. Villaturiel's proposal was approved by Leyva, who urged the King to accept it. Illustrations from the 18th century show that they had disappeared almost entirely by then. Leyva himself would design an improved curtain wall, completed around 1551.

Following the report by Juan Bautista Antonelli in 1574, Philip II commissioned Jacobo Palear Fratín to plan a large bastion (originally called Ingente, but later San Felipe), similar to that at Fuenterrabía; works were also carried out on the defences to the castle, including a large battery for six cannon from which to defend the port on the estuary of the River Urumea.

In 1595, the Italian engineer Tiburzio Spannocchi, having already worked on several other fortresses around the Iberian Peninsula, projected works on the fortifications in the north of the country, including those at San Sebastián, before being appointed, in 1601, chief engineer of all the kingdoms of Spain, in charge of all their fortresses. He projected a wall, known as the Spanocchi Wall, which was not completed at the time, to separate, from west to east, the port and the town from Mount Urgull itself. He also agreed with Fratín's recommendation to reinforce the defences to the castle itself rather than to the town and projected a citadel structure around La Mota. However, no drawings have been found for this.

=== 17th century ===
Following the death of Spannocchi, his successor, Jerónimo de Soto, also projected, in 1610, a citadel around La Mota but, again, no information has been found to date regarding its structure.

During the Franco-Spanish War (1635–1659), major works were carried out by Marco Antonio Gandolfo, Pedro Texeira and Jerónimo de Soto, with the latter again insisting on the impregnable nature of La Mota. The three engineers projected moving the front forward, with wide bastions below those of the existing Ingente and Gobernador bastions, a glacis, a large ravelin and a moat, as well as a second moat to separate the old front from the new extension.

In the early 1640s, having recommended against the enlargement of the castle itself as a citadel, due to the excessive costs involved, when it only needed more ramparts, Juan de Garay proposed major works to the town's defences instead and the following year, Diego de Isasi presented plans for a citadel to be constructed around Mount Urgull, between the castle and the town. That same year, Marco Antonio Gandolfo gave his favourable opinion and Garay presented a major project with all the previous proposals, including the citadel for the castle. However, the project was not adopted.

In the second half of the 17th century, several works were projected by Alonso de Cepeda, Francisco Domingo y Cueva, Octaviano Meni and Hércules Torelli, the latter also reconstructing the castle keep following the explosion of the magazine in 1688, due to it being struck by lightning. Following the destruction to much of the castle, fierce debate broke out as to the merits of simply restoring it or designing a new fortification at the top of the hill.

In 1693, work was concluded on one of the most important projects, the Mirador battery, on the east slope of Mount Urgull, to cover the approach from the sea and from La Zurriola beach.

=== 18th century ===
==== Siege of San Sebastián (1719) ====
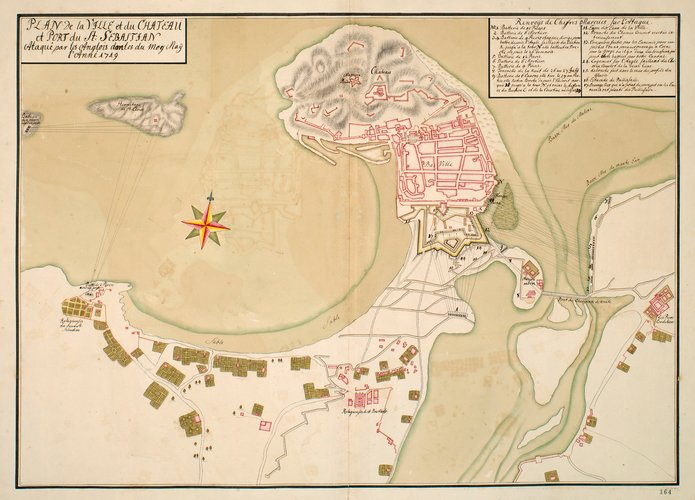
Map of the city at the time of the siege in 1719

Having invested San Sebastián on 30 June, the French, under the Duke of Berwick, began positioning batteries along the Urumea where the city's walls were most vulnerable. Although heavy rain slowed the digging of trenches, by 25 July the French artillery was able to open fire on the walls. The siege guns rapidly created a breach and pounded it until it was practical to be stormed. As was the convention at the time, and following instructions given by Philip V's favourite, Alberoni, the Spanish commander Alejandro de la Motte requested a parley and his garrison were allowed to retreat into the castle, leaving the remainder of the city to French control.

Meanwhile, Berwick was able to establish batteries with a clearer range on the castle, and launched fresh bombardments of mortar fire which struck the magazine, and also destroyed the garrison's food provisions. Morale in the garrison rapidly declined, and their commander sought terms from Berwick, surrendering the town on 1 August 1719 and moving up into the castle, from which they made a sortie, to no avail, on 13 August, and capitulating some days later, on 17 August. The French artillery attack had been from the La Zurriola beach on the other side of the Urumea, and the Mirador battery had proved insufficient to repel the attack and had itself suffered major damage. Berwick's attack had left two major breaches: on the old wall between the rounded bastions of Amézqueta and Los Hornos, and a second breach between the latter bastion and that of El Gobernador, to the left of the "royal front", thereby creating a blind spot in the defences. When Berwick departed, he left behind a garrison of 2,000 French troops.

==== Jorge de Verboom ====
In 1725, Verboom directed the projects for the fortification of San Sebastián, Pamplona and Fuenterrabía. He entrusted his son Isidro Próspero with drawing up the project for San Sebastián. With his project "to render [the city] and its castle, Sta. Cruz de la Mota, the best state of defence", as well as repairing the breaches from the siege of 1719, Isidro Verboom strengthened the defences at strategic points, and established a system of batteries at the top of Mount Urgull.

His project included bombproofing the roofs of the barracks, the hospital and the storeroom for provisions, as well as enlarging the inner bailey.

==== Juan Martín Cermeño ====
In 1756, Cermeño drew up plans for the fortifications at San Sebastián, including those of the Frente de Tierra (land-front, the stretch of sand and land between the town and Mount Urgull) and projected the defensive works for La Zurriola beach, between the estuary of the Urumea and Mount Ulia.

==== War of the Pyrenees (1793–1795) ====
In August 1794, French troops took San Sebastián without resistance, abandoning it the following year with the signing of the Peace of Basel (July 1795).

=== 19th century ===
==== Fortifications at San Sebastián (early 19th century) ====
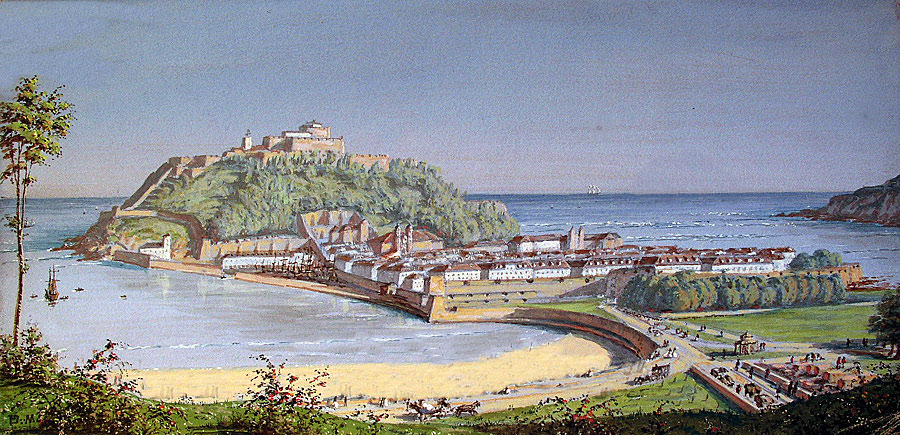
The city of San Sebastián, showing the castle at the top of Mount Urgull, before the British siege of 1813

The defences at San Sebastián at that time were a combination of natural and man-made features, with the city's fortifications and La Mota castle on Monte Orgullo being distinct but interconnected defences. Thus, the city's location on a narrow peninsula provided some natural protection, with the estuary of the River Urumea to the east and to the west, "a tiny bay about sixteen hundred yards across at its broadest," further limiting access. Its man-made fortifications included a high wall, eight feet thick, with the bastion of St. Elmo at the north-eastern angle, and the two small towers of Los Hornos and Las Miguetas towards the southern end with a bastion in the centre, "covered by a hornwork, with the usual counterscarp, covered way and glacis; but these works were dominated throughout by the neighbouring heights [the hills of Igueldo and Orgullo] which were in range of cannon". The hornwork further strengthened the defences on the landward side. The bastions, projecting outward, allowed for flanking fire.

Monte Orgullo itself was protected from assault from the north by deep water and cliffs. Although the castle also had seaward-facing batteries, the landward battery of La Mota, together with two batteries to the right and left of it, "were able from their great elevation to sweep the isthmus from end to end", thereby providing artillery support to the city's defences, while the city walls helped protect the lower slopes of Monte Orgullo.

==== Peninsular War ====
On 5 March 1808, faced with an assault on the city by Marshal Bessières' Corps of Observation of the Pyrenees, the governor of San Sebastián, under orders from Madrid not to resist, surrendered. The following July, Napoleon and his brother, the new King of Spain, José Bonaparte, entered San Sebastián, which would remain under French control until the British siege in 1813.

Now garrisoned by 2,218 French troops under General Thouvenot, named governor on 8 November, Thouvenot, however, would complain in xxxx, that his garrison had been reduced to 300 men, and xxxx.

===== Siege of San Sebastián (7 July – 8 September 1813) =====
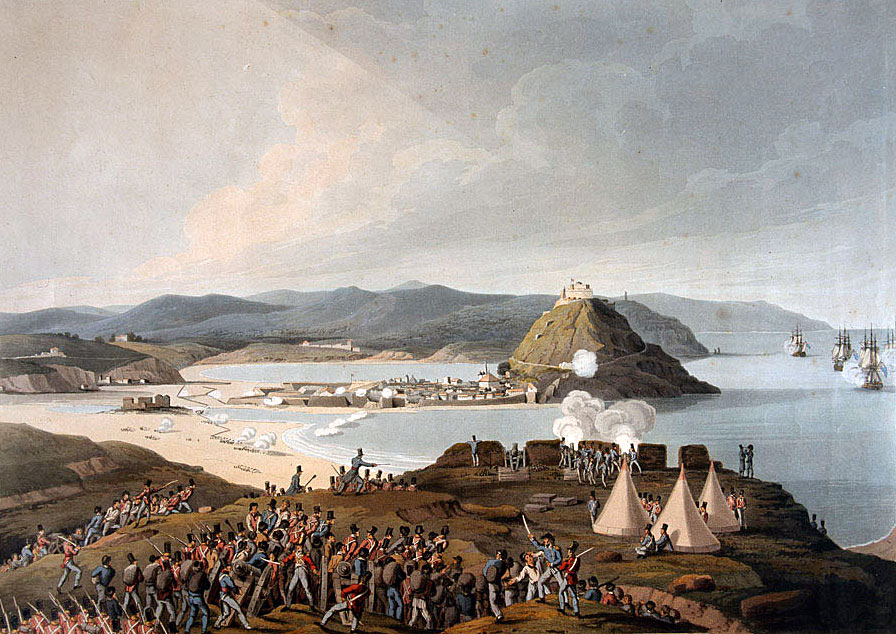
The castle and its fortifications seen from the British batteries on the Chofre sand hills across the Urumea estuary (1813)

In March 1813, San Sebastián, under General Rey, had a garrison of 600 French troops. When he complained that he needed four to five thousand and by June, his garrison was increased to 2,300, and on 1 July, numbered 3,000 men, with 76 guns, of which 13 were positioned behind the castle defences.

On 8 September, sixty-one British guns and mortars began their bombardment of the castle defences and after two hours, in which all the defences had been levelled to the ground, Rey surrendered his garrison of some 1,300 troops, plus 450 wounded and the almost 350 Portuguese and British prisoners captured on previous assaults.

==== Hundred Thousand Sons of Saint Louis (April – November 1823) ====
Some five army corps French troops (the bulk of the French regular army), under Louis Antoine, Duke of Angoulême, entered Spain to help the Spanish Bourbon royalists restore King Ferdinand VII of Spain to the absolute power of which he had been deprived during the Liberal Triennium. San Sebastián was blockaded, rather than besieged, by French troops under Jean Bourke from the first week of April until September, when General Étienne Ricard finally entered the city, taking the castle on 3 October.

==== First Carlist War (1833–1839) ====
In 1835, the supporters of the late king's brother, Carlos de Borbón, known as Carlists (carlistas), blockaded San Sebastián, which supported the regent, Maria Christina, acting for Isabella II of Spain. The first contingent of British Legion troops arrived to garrison San Sebastián on 11 July. By the time their commanding officer, General Lacy Evans arrived in Spain, on August 17th 1835, there were 2,803 British troops in the city (plus 1,819 at Santander). The first combat involving the Legion at San Sebastián took place on 30 August. Having blockaded the city from 1 September, on 7 December the Carlists started bombarding the city from San Bartolomé Hill, razing the outskirts at San Martín and Santa Catalina, until a sortie by the British troops was able to take the artillery position.

San Sebastián was ideally located for a joint operation of the Royal Navy and land forces and from 14 March 1836, the Royal Navy and its Marines took an active role in the fighting. On 5 May 1836, the day of Lacy's arrival, he launched an attack with the reinforcements of Lord Hay, consisting of 800 Royal Marines, of which 100 were gunners and the remainder, Major John Owen's infantry battalion which, combined with Royal Navy artillery fire, were able to lift the siege and push the Carlists back towards Hernani.

===== British Auxiliary Legion =====
The Legion, raised ad hoc for intervention in Spain, was a force whose junior or senior officers at the time included, apart from its commanding officer, Lacy —whose active service included being with Wellington at Waterloo—, such notable military figures as William Reid, Charles Shaw, John Le Marchant, John Owen, Duncan MacDougal, xxxx, and Maurice O'Connell, consisted, initially, of ten infantry regiments (two of which would be dissolved in the winter of 1836, due to the typhoid epidemic), a rifle regiment and two lancer regiments (700 horse) which, together with Engineers, Artillery, and the medical corps, etc., numbered some ten thousand men. Attached to the Legion was a 700-strong permanent battalion of Chapelgorris, a Spanish volunteer light infantry unit.

==== Mid-19th century ====
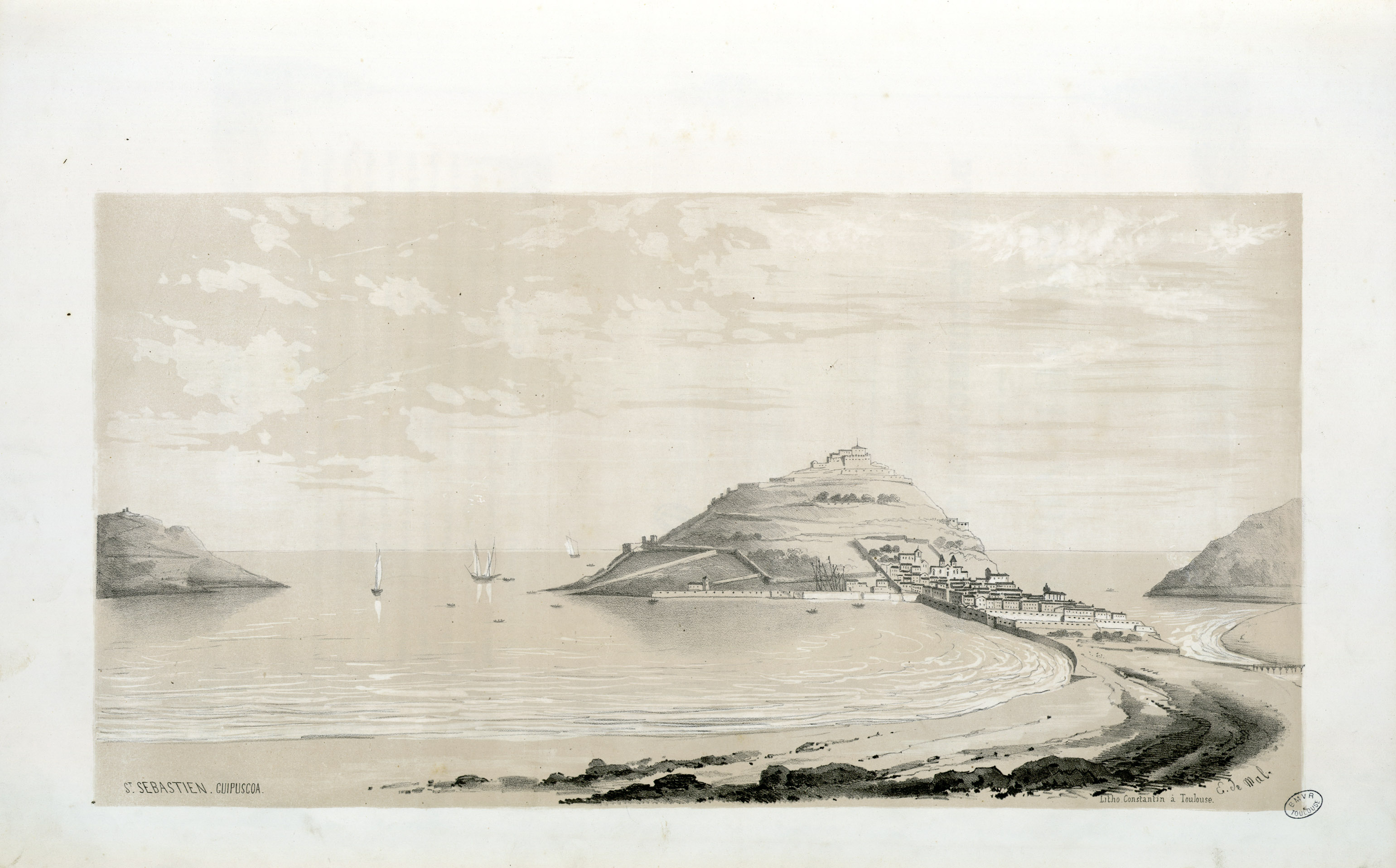
Lithograph of San Sebastián in 1843, by Eugène de Malbos (1811–1858), showing the castle at the top of Monte Orgullo as well as the fortifications below. (Bibliothèques de Toulouse.)

Between 1863 and 1866, the bombproof Santiago barracks, sleeping 200 men, plus sergeants and four officers, were built. They were partially demolished with the demilitarisation of Monte Urgull in 1921.

==== Spanish–American War (1898) ====
Due to the threat of a US naval attack during the Spanish–American War in 1898, works were carried out to reinforce the fortress.
