= Beach of La Concha =

Beach in Donostia-San Sebastian, Basque Country

Coordinates: 43°19′03″N 1°59′12″W

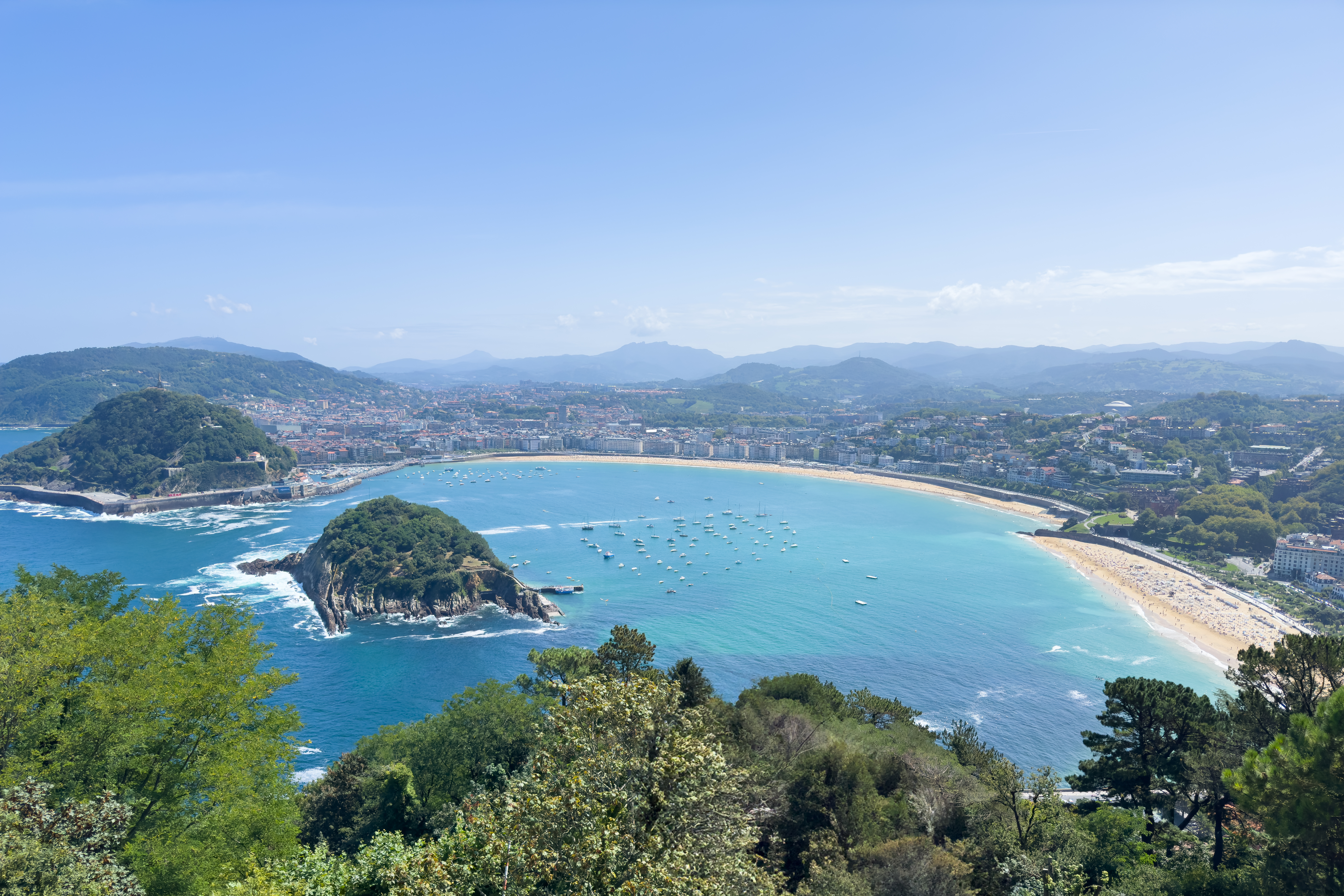
View of La Concha beach in San Sebastián from Mount Igueldo

The Beach of La Concha (Basque: Kontxa Hondartza [kontʃa ondarts̻a]; Spanish: Playa de La Concha [ˈplaʝa ðe la ˈkontʃa], "cone shell beach") is a crescent shaped urban seaboard of the city of San Sebastián located at the Bay of La Concha in the Basque Country, in northern Spain. Its name “Concha” is given upon its remarkably regular shape. The scenic setting in the Bay of La Concha and the 19th century elegance of fashionable seaside resorts have made the site very popular, as it is frequently cited as one of the most beautiful and the most famous urban beaches in Europe.

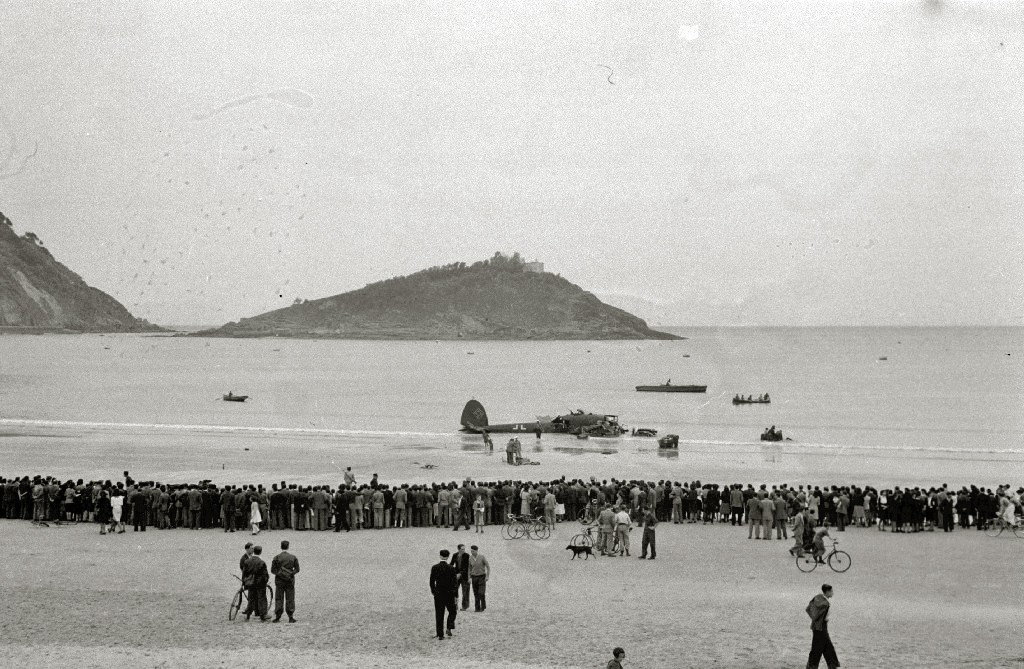
Léon Degrelle's Heinkel He 111 that landed in the waters of La Concha

Léon Degrelle, a Belgian politician and one of the most notable Nazi collaborators during World War II, made a water landing at La Concha in May 1945 to escape Allied repercussion. He would go into exile in the country until his death in 1994. In addition, the beach of La Concha is referenced in Ernest Hemingway's classic The Sun Also Rises; the main character Jake Barnes briefly swims and dives in the Beach of La Concha at the end.

It is a sandy beach and shallow substrate, in which the tide fluctuation greatly affects the area available for use. It can be considered an urban beach in widespread use.

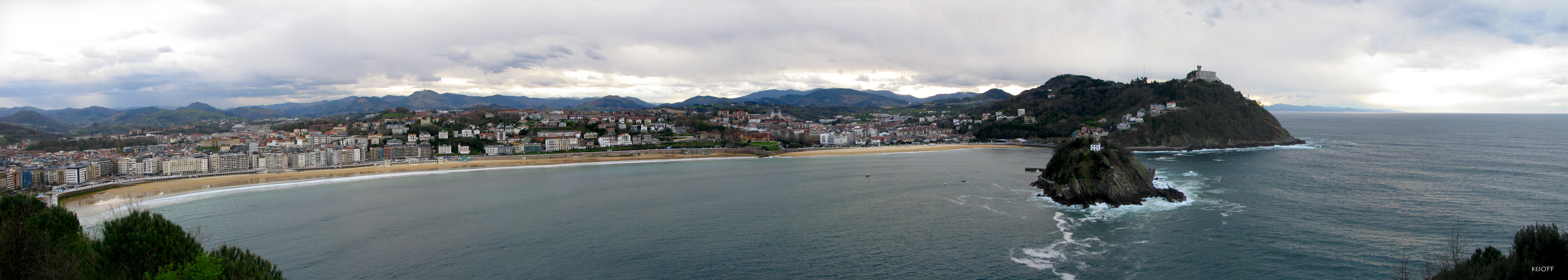
Panorama

== See also ==
- San Sebastián
