= Urgull =

Hill by the ocean in the Basque city of San Sebastián, Gipuzkoa, Spain

Coordinates: 43°19′29″N 1°59′20″W

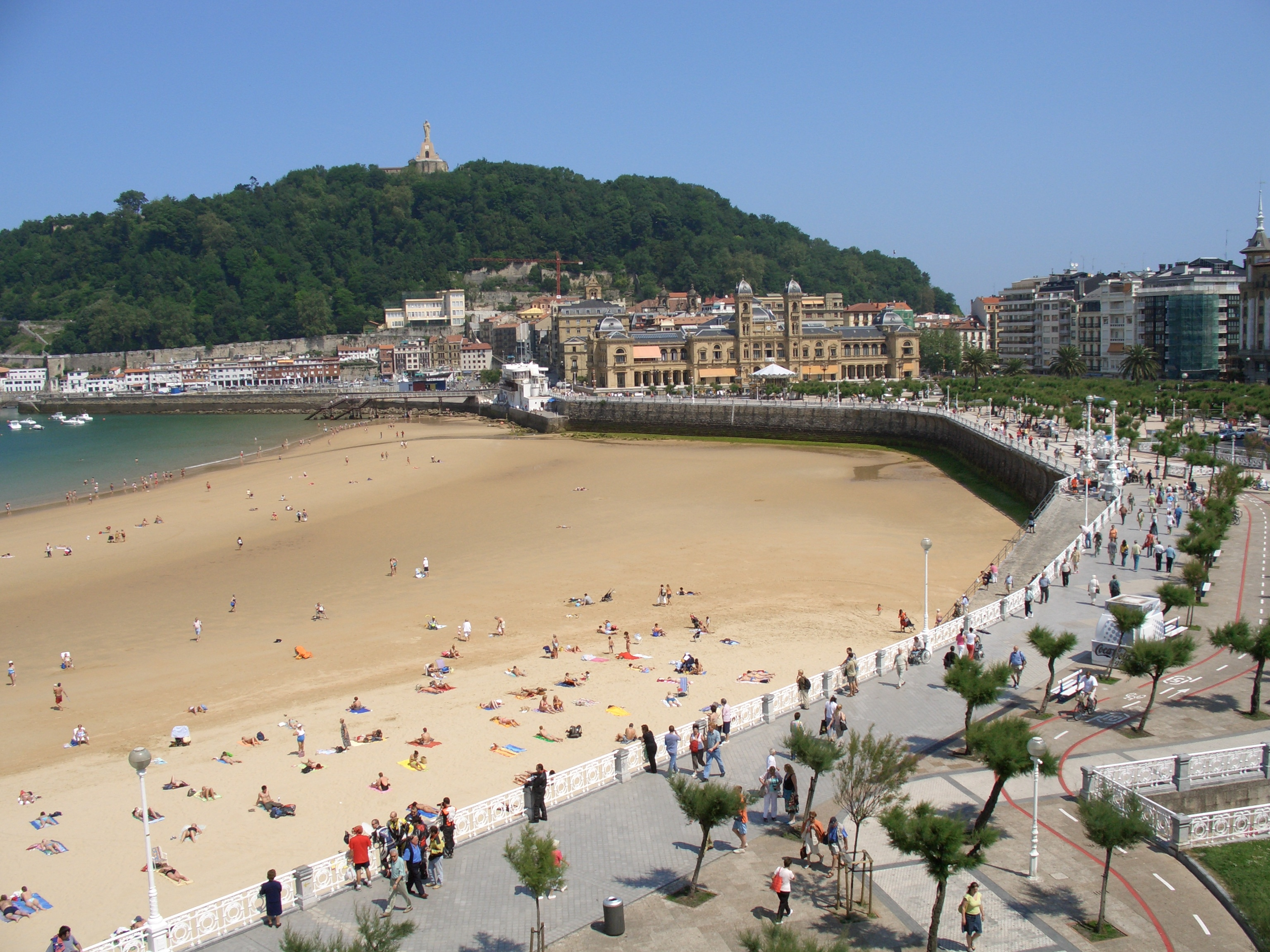
Photo of San Sebastian with Urgull in the background.

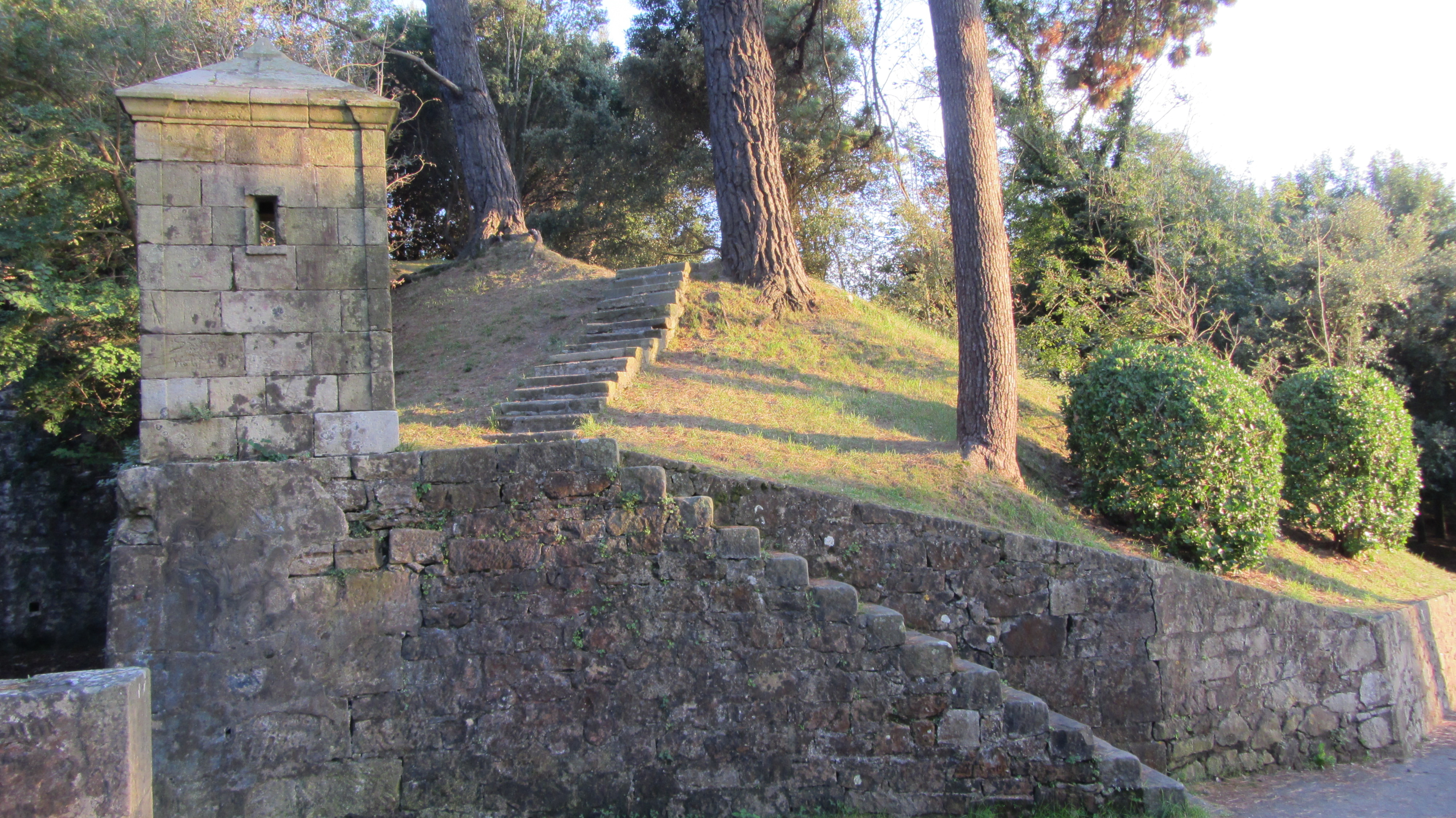
Stairs leading to Mota Castle.

Urgull is a hill located in the Basque city of San Sebastián, Gipuzkoa, Spain. It has a peak elevation of 123 meters and is a defining feature of the city's coastal topography along with Mount Ulia and Igeldo. Urgull is situated between the old town and the Paseo Nuevo, at the eastern end of La Concha Bay; and is one of the city’s biggest green spaces.

The hill served as a strategic defense point during the 12th century. With the establishment of modern state boundaries in the 16th century, the fortifications on the hill were reinforced at its summit stands Mota Castle, whose features include headquarters, barracks, warehouses, a chapel and a 12-meter-long sculpture of Jesus Christ added in 1950.

Urgull played a notable role in military operations, including the Siege of San Sebastián in 1813 and various assaults during the Carlist Wars in 1823, 1836 and 1876. However, as San Sebastián transformed into a tourist resort, the hill lost its military importance and was sold to the city council in 1924. Today, Urgull is primarily covered in trees, with military structures and promenades offering views over the bay and the city. The historic stronghold at the summit now houses a history museum, which is part of the San Telmo Museoa located at the southeastern access of the hill.

== See also ==
- Mont Orgueil – Castle in Jersey
