= Igeldo =

Igeldo/Igueldo
- Quarter of San Sebastian
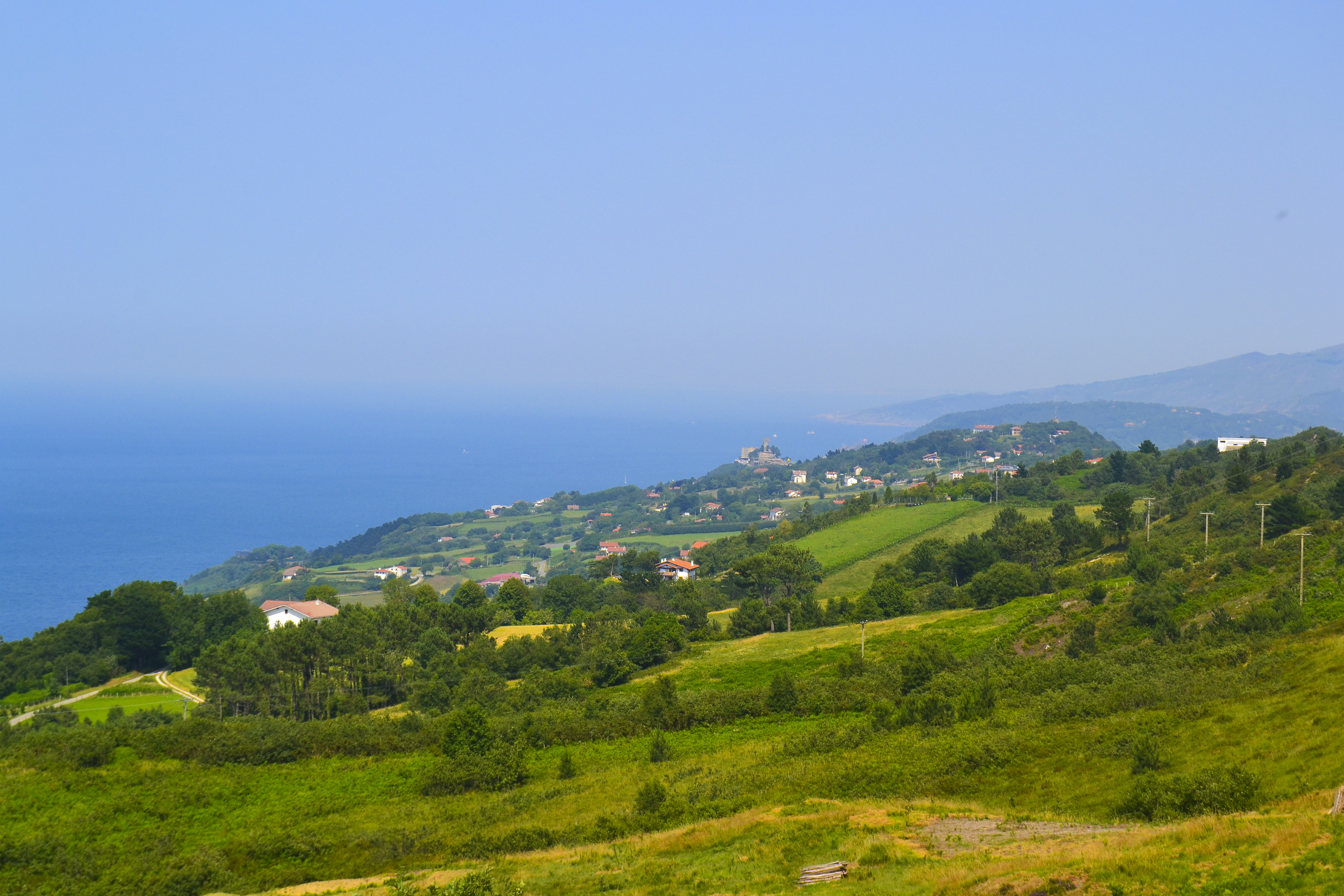

- Coordinates: 43°18′32″N 2°2′14″W
- Country: Spain
- Autonomous Community: Basque Country
- Province: Gipuzkoa
- Comarca: Donostialdea
- Municipality: San Sebastian

Population (2013)
  - Total: 1,105

Igeldo (in Spanish Igueldo) is a quarter of San Sebastian (Gipuzkoa, Basque Country, Spain). It is almost a small town located at the mountain range of the same name towering over the west side of the Bay of La Concha (Kontxako Badia). At the nearest point of the bay lies a permanent fairground at the hillock Mendiotz, topped by a conspicuous mock military tower (actually built up at the beginning of the 20th century for tourism) which houses a hotel. There is a frequented camp-site on the area.

The process to segregate it from San Sebastian in 2013 was stopped by a local Court.
