= San Sebastián metropolitan area =

San Sebastián metropolitan area Área metropolitana de San Sebastián Donostiako metropoli eremua
- Urban area
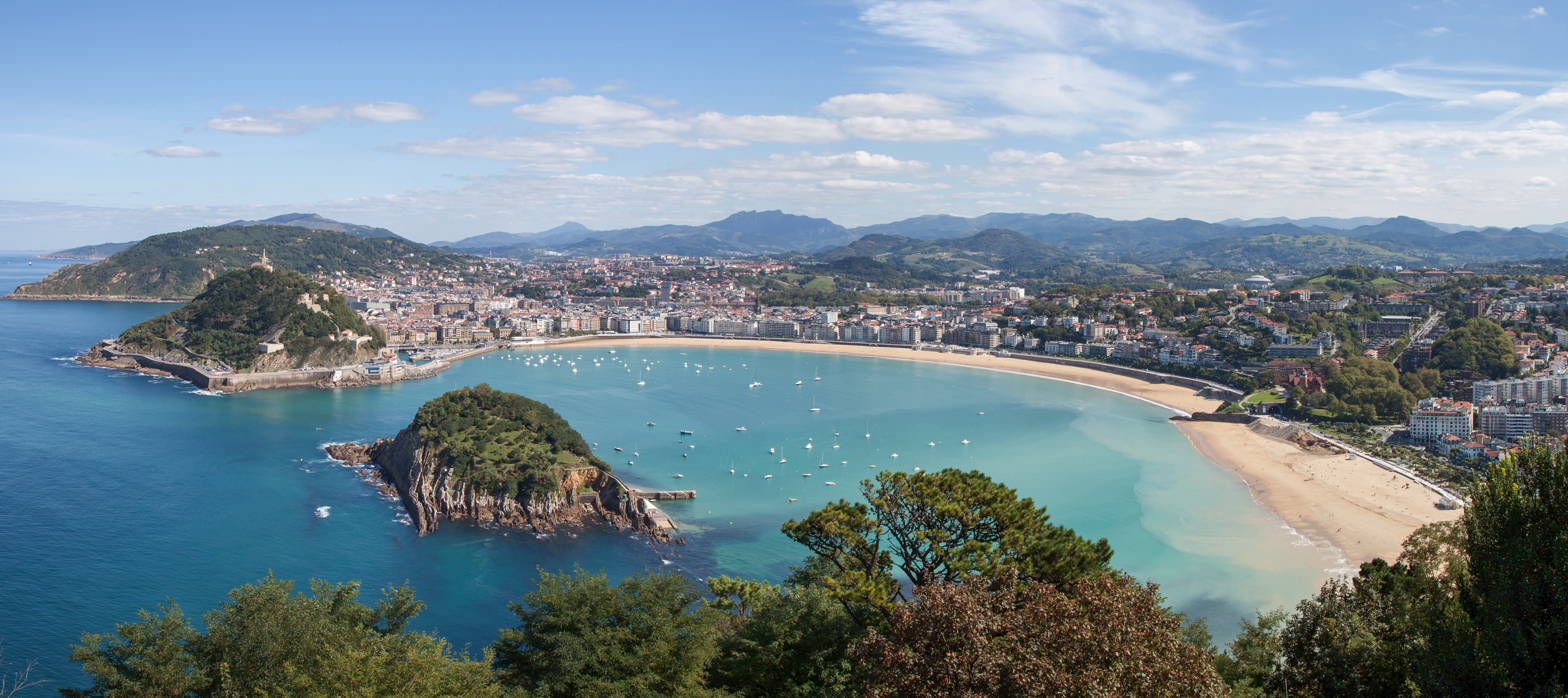
- Panorama of San Sebastián
- Country: Spain
- Largest city: San Sebastián

Area
  - Metro: 410 km^{2} (160 sq mi)

Population
  - Metro: 454,669
  - Metro density: 1,093/km^{2} (2,830/sq mi)

GDP
  - Metro: €21.797 billion

San Sebastián metropolitan area is an area in the province of Gipuzkoa (Spain) which extends into Labourd (France). It includes, besides the city of San Sebastián, a number of nearby municipalities, some of them bordering. Its total population is 405,099 inhabitants, with its extension of 372.86 square kilometres. It is the 19 th urban agglomeration of Spain in terms of population.

== Municipalities of the metropolitan area ==
Municipality	Shire	Population (2008)	Area in km^{2}	Density in inhab\km^{2}	Distance to San Sebastián's city centre in km
San Sebastián	Donostialdea	183,308	60.89	3,006.9	0
Irun	Bidasoa-Txingudi	60,261	42.40	1,421.25	16.5
Errenteria	Donostialdea	38,336	32.26	1,188.34	6.8
Hernani	Donostialdea	19,138	39.82	480.61	6
Lasarte-Oria	Donostialdea	17,647	6.01	2,936.27	6.5
Pasaia	Donostialdea	16,091	11.34	1,418.96	4
Hondarribia	Bidasoa-Txingudi	16,073	28.63	561.4	17.5
Andoain	Donostialdea	14,215	27.17	523.19	11.5
Hendaye	Arrondissement of Bayonne (France)	12,596	8	1,574.5	18
Oiartzun	Donostialdea	9,806	59.71	164.23	10.5
Urnieta	Donostialdea	5,998	22.4	267.77	8
Lezo	Donostialdea	5,912	8.59	688.24	10.5
Usurbil	Donostialdea	5,718	25.64	223.01	7.6
Total	-	405,099	372.86	1086.46	-
