= Bidasoa-Txingudi =

The place-name Bidasoa-Txingudi is a recent creation, combining the name of the river Bidasoa, which here provides a natural frontier between France and Spain in the Basque Country, with that of a bay on the French side of the estuary, the Bay of Txingudi.

It is formed by the towns of Irun and Hondarribia on the Spanish side of the France–Spain border and the neighbouring town of Hendaye (Hendaia) on the French side. In 1999, a decade of efforts to forge closer links between these three municipalities, with a combined population of around 85,000, bore fruit in the launching of a ‘consortium’ set up to undertake cross-frontier projects in the area. In Basque, the consortium is known as Bidasoa-Txingudi Mugaz Gaindiko Partzuergoa, in French as Consorcio transfrontalier Bidasoa-Txingudi and in Spanish as Consorcio Transfronterizo Bidasoa-Txingudi. The French version of the name, using the Spanish word consorcio rather than the French consortium, reflects the fact that it was set up using a Spanish legal vehicle for co-operation between local authorities.

One of the first acts of the promoters of cross-frontier cooperation was to create a new name for the area. Prior to the three towns’ cooperation initiative, the name of the river Bidasoa had been used to define the 'comarca' (a Spanish territorial type of district), which groups Irun and Hondarribia as the Comarca del Bajo Bidasoa. But there had been no common name covering the broader area also including Hendaia. The name Txingudi, written in accordance with modern Basque orthography, was originally applied to a small marshy bay on the edges of Hendaia. In recent years, it had also come to be applied to a marshy area between Irun and Hondarribia which was made into a nature reserve under the protection of the Basque government in 1998, and by extension to the area around the Bidasoa estuary. By combining this name with the name of the river, the initiators of the cross-border project invented a catchy new name, Bidasoa-Txingudi. The bestowing of a new name for the area of Bidasoa-Txingudi supported efforts to create a sense of common identity among people on either side of the frontier and thus bolster acceptance of cross-frontier cooperation. The fact that the promoters of the cooperation project chose to spell the new name in Basque rather than French (Chingoudy) or Spanish (Chingudi) was both a way of emphasizing the common Basque culture on either side of the frontier and a deliberate ploy to provide a stamp of Basque political correctness on the project.

Source: Bray, Zoe 2004 Living Boundaries: frontiers and identity in the Basque Country, Brussels: PIE Peter Lang
