= Bidasoaldea =

Region of Guipúzcoa

Coordinates: 43°21′12″N 1°48′33″W

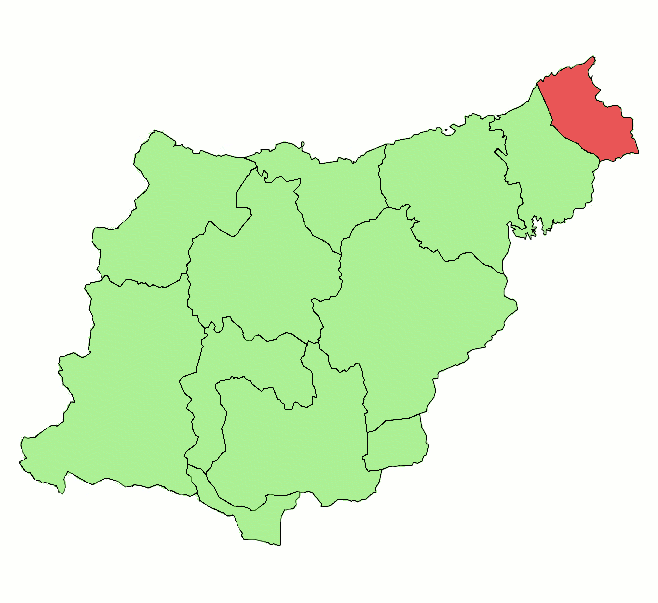
Map of Bidasoaldea

Bidasoaldea (Basque: Bidasoaldea, Spanish: Bajo Bidasoa) is one of the eight eskualdeak or comarcas of Gipuzkoa, Basque Autonomous Community, corresponding to the basin of the lower Bidasoa extending in Gipuzkoan soil and named after the river, in Spain. The region comprises two municipalities, i.e. Hondarribia and Irun. This is the most easterly land strip of Gipuzkoa, bordering on the east with the region of Labourd (France), on the south with the Bortziriak (Navarre), on the west with Oarsoaldea and on the north with the Bay of Biscay.

== See also ==
- Bidasoa-Txingudi
