= Great Cross of Hendaye =

Stone cross in France

Coordinates: 43°21′32″N 1°46′28″W

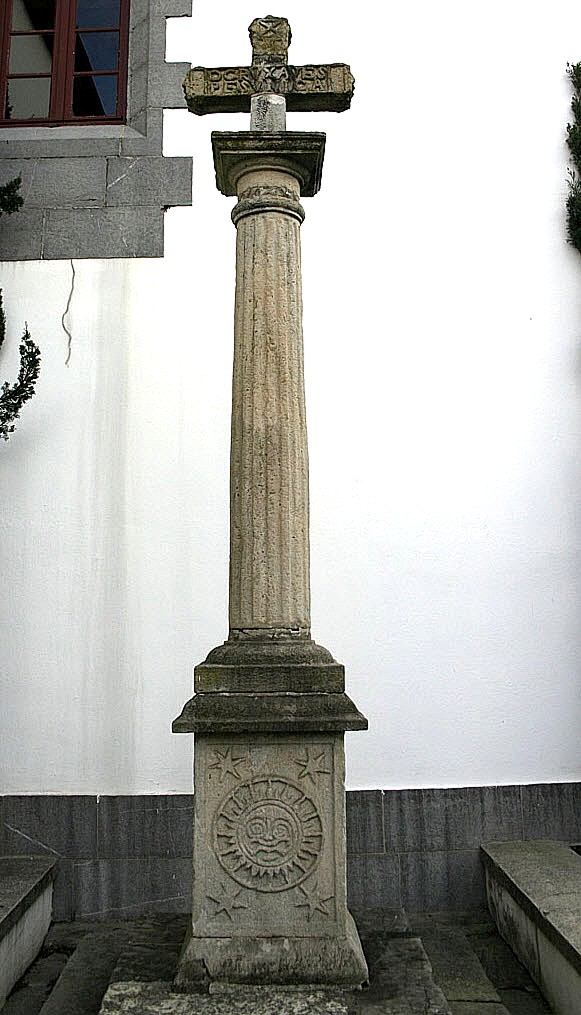
Cross of Hendaye

The Great Cross of Hendaye (French: Croix d'Hendaye) is a stone cross located on the town square of Hendaye, in the Pyrénées-Atlantiques, in southwestern France. The cross includes references to apocalyptic beliefs about Christianity, Rosicrucianism, and alchemy. Many, including devotees of Nostradamus, the Bible Code, and especially the 2012 phenomenon, believed that a great comet would pass by, or crash into the earth in the year 2012, and interpreted the Cross of Hendaye as another reminder that 2012 would be the end.

== Description ==
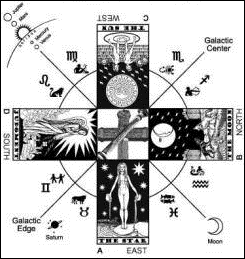
Upper Cross of Hendaye

The cross comprises three parts with engravings in its stone. These engravings picture alchemical symbols that occultists believe contain encrypted information on a future global catastrophe. An important part of understanding The Cross of Hendaye is found in the writings of the mysterious alchemist Fulcanelli, who hints in his 1926 book 'Le Mystere des Cathedrales', that on the cross is encoded a warning of "a purifying fire that will soon consume the Northern Hemisphere."

The creation and transportation of the Cross of Hendaye is rumored to have been funded by a Christian society known as the Rosicrucians. The Cross is a paradigm for synergy, where the whole is greater than the sum of the parts alone. The entire monument is said to be a schematic of the Philosopher's Stone.

Of the symbols found on the cross, it is essential to examine all the parts of the Cross together so that a holistic interpretation is faithfully determined rather than simply analyzing symbols individually.

== The Monument ==
Divided into three basic parts these are the Upper Cross, Greek Cross, the column, and the pedestal base. Each are further divided into their own components. The Upper cross has three symbols, the pillar has its own symbol, and the base has four symbols.

1. Upper Cross: Three Main Symbols are: traditional inscription of INRI(located on top of the cross), two double 'X' markings, and a broken Latin inscription that reads O crux ave spes unica ("Hail to the Cross, our only hope"). These symbols offer a three-way inter-related meaning system, which gives the key to understanding the entire process as symbolized by the monument.
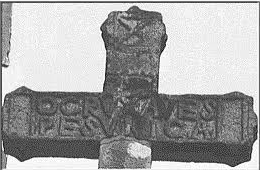
2. The pillar: The pillar plays a unifying role on the monument that serves as a link which bonds each element of the Cross together and explains that each portion of the Cross is to be considered in union with the remaining portions of the Cross. The cross is a single entity and its overall meaning is not to be interpreted based only on one of the elements but rather the overall meaning should be based on all of the elements together.
3. The Base: The four symbols engraved on the base must be taken as a united whole in which the order and meaning of the symbols are constant. The images are: an eight-ray star burst, a half moon shape with an eye spot, an angry sun face with a bulging spiral eye, and an oval that fills the entire space of the rectangle (which is quartered by a cross). Of the four symbols found on the Cross, there are two that have are believed to have significant meaning. The Sun Face symbol and the Oval Symbol.
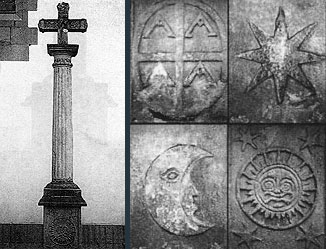
  Cross and Base of Cross

- Sun Face Symbol:

The face of the Sun is framed by 16 large spikes and 16 smaller spikes inside a containing outer circle. The Sun is then surrounded by four stars, which are placed in the corners of the rectangle and titled so that the diagonal axis continues through the center point of the Sun face. Which then draws a Galactic Alignment through the Sun.

- Oval Symbol:

The oval has four capital letter "A"'s in it. One 'A' is positioned on each side of the arms of the cross. The A's are unusual in that they have a sharply angled cross bar set in the top angle of each 'A' rather than the usual horizontal cross bar

== Fulcanelli's Deciphering: Upper Cross ==
1. INRI: INRI is most commonly known as the acronym of the Latin phrase IESVS NAZARENVS REX IVD ÆORVM, which translates to 'Jesus the Nazarene, King of the Jews'. Through the Rosicrucian Alchemical Tradition, INRI is interpreted as IGNE NATURA RENOVATUR INTEGRA, which translates as 'By Fire Nature is Renewed Whole' and is one of the key maxims of alchemy. This phrase is important to Alchemists, but it also holds the Christian belief that the end of the world will be signaled with the return of Jesus Christ and the wicked will burn in fire, and then the Earth will be renewed and made whole.
2. Double X's: The two Xs are placed on the Upper Cross, firmly planted on the symbol of Christ. There are two possible explanations behind this. The first is that the two X's symbolize that Christ is the 'Alpha and Omega' as described in Revelations Chapters 1, 21, and 22. Christ is thus, the beginning and the end. The second explanation is that, these two X's are a reminder of the shape of an hourglass. The hourglass was the main system of time keeping during the time of which the Cross was created. Fulcanelli believed that the hourglass meant several things on the cross. First, he believed that it represented how the time of the world was running short. Second, he believed that while the first X symbolizes the beginning of the world, the second X symbolizes the end of the world. For an alchemist, the beginning and the end are both with fire. Fulcanelli believed that the end of the world would come by fire. The third explanation is that these two Xs symbolize the Galactic Alignment, and that the time when they would align is 21 December 2012
3. OCRUXAVES PESUNICA: When decoded it reads, O Crux Ave Spes Unica, which translates to 'Hail O Cross, the Only Hope'. However, when examining the inscription, Fulcanelli noticed something unique about the inscription, and that was the misplaced 'S'. Although he called attention to the "incorrect grammar", he believed that there was no mistake. But instead that the creator of the Cross wanted the interpretation to be 'Measure of the Twelfth Part'. Fulcanelli believed that this phrase was a clear reference to the cosmic cycles and alignments. He believed that the 'S', which takes on a curving shape of a snake, corresponds to the Greek khi (X) and takes over its esoteric meaning.

- Making references to the 'Key' or 'Cross' in the sky, which are made by the X of the snake or dragon, Fulcanelli informs us that this explanation is the helicoidal track of the sun.
- Noting on the misspelled word, 'SPES' translates to 'hope', however in its reverse, 'SEPS' translates to 'snake.'

== Fulcanelli's deciphering: Base ==
The four symbols found on the base are: Sun, Moon, Great Star, and a Simple circle. The circle is divided by two perpendicular diameters into four sectors in which there are four As displayed.

- The four As can be used to explain the four phases of the Great Cyclic Period in Medieval times. The four phases were represented either by: the Four Evangelists; by their symbolic letter, which is the Greek letter alpha; or by the four evangelical beasts surrounding Christ. These four quadrants are believed to stand for the four ages of the world. This symbolizes the diagram used to indicate the solar cycle, upon which the Galactic Alignment and procession rest.
- This traditional formula is often seen on the tympana of Roman porches. Where Jesus is shown seated with his left hand resting on a book and his right hand is raised in the gestures of benediction. He is separated from the four beasts which attend him by an ellipse, which is called the mystic almond. These groups are seen in many chapels and cathedrals throughout Europe, including Church of Templars at Luz in Hautes Pyrénées

== Interpreting the Cross: End of the World ==
Through analysis of all the alchemical symbols found on the cross, it is believed that the Cross of Hendaye is a physical representation of the belief that the world is quickly coming to an end. And, as the symbols suggest, the end of the world will occur in the midst of fire. This belief was brought upon by the ancient Christian group, the Rosicrucians, and alchemists. Many believe that the end will be the return of Christ as referenced in the Bible.

- As Jay Weidner cites Fulcanelli's quote, "The age of iron has no other seal than that of Death. Its hieroglyph is the skeleton, bearing the attributes of Saturn: the empty hourglasses, symbols of time run out..."
- The Great Cross of Hendaye is believed to describe the end of both the four ages of the Hindu Yuga system as well as the four ages of alchemical chronological timekeeping.
