= Bay of Txingudi =

- Txingudiko badia (in Basque); Baie de Chingoudy (in French); Bahía de Chingudi (in Spanish)
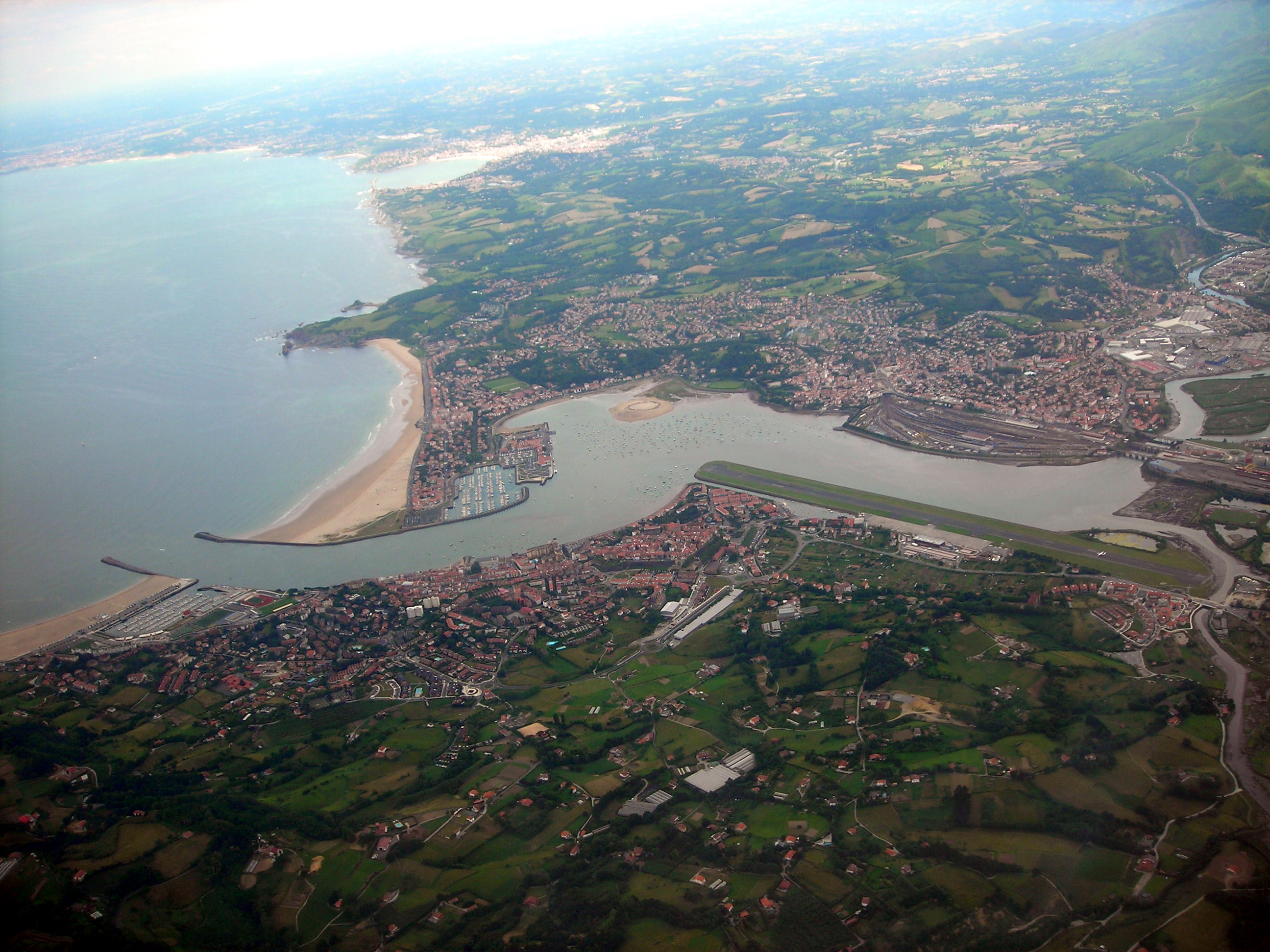

- Location within Pyrenees
- Coordinates: 43.365°N 1.777°W
- Type: bay
- Part of: estuary of the Bidasoa
- Primary inflows: Bidasoa
- Ocean/sea sources: Atlantic
- Basin countries: France; Spain

Ramsar Wetland
- Official name: Txingudi
- Designated: 24 October 2002
- Reference no.: 1264

The Bay of Txingudi (Basque: Txingudiko badia, French: Baie de Chingoudy, Spanish: Bahía de Chingudi) is a bay in the right or French bank of the estuary of the Bidasoa river, near Hendaye in the département of Pyrénées-Atlantiques in south-west France. It faces the town of Hondarribia and the airport of San Sebastián in the Gipuzkoa province of the Basque Country, in north-eastern Spain. The border between the two countries passes through the Bidasoa estuary. It is an important area for bird-watching.

The name may, by extension, be applied to the whole body of water between the French and Spanish sides. The coastal marshes on the Spanish side have been designated as a protected Ramsar site since 2002.
