= Coqueline Courrèges =

French fashion designer (born 1935)

- Jacqueline Barrière
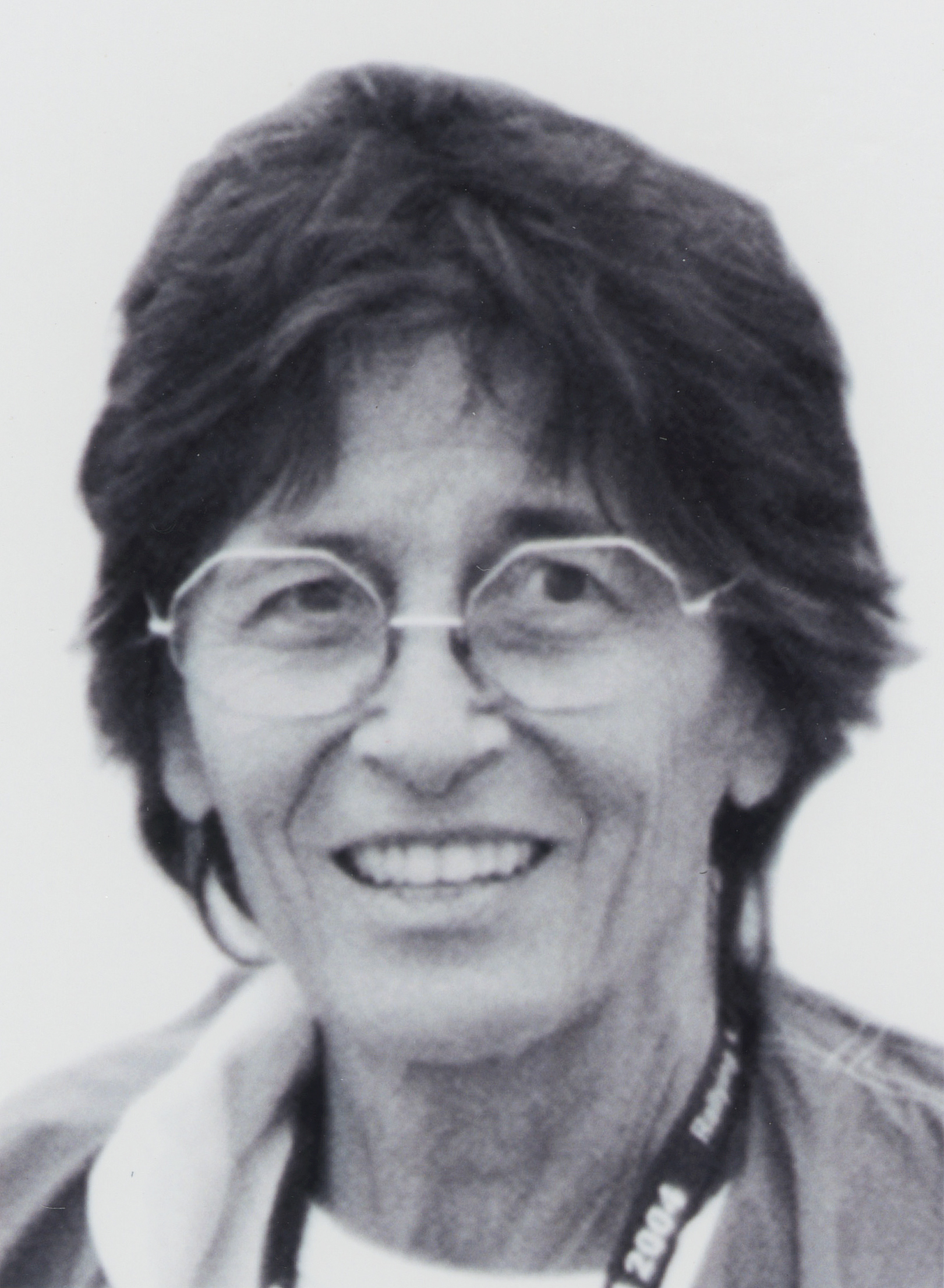
- Born: July 25, 1935; Hendaye, France
- Occupations: Couture, Design, Electric Vehicles
- Label: Courrèges
- Spouse: André Courrèges (married 1966)
- Children: 1

Coqueline Courrèges (born Jacqueline Berthe Marthe Barrière; 25 July 1935) is a French dressmaker and co-founder of the Courrèges fashion house.

== Biography ==
Coqueline Courrèges was born Jacqueline Barrière on July 25, 1935, in Hendaye, France. She arrived in Paris at the age of 14 to sit for her dress-making training certificate.

In 1952, she joined Balenciaga, where she met André Courrèges. It was he who first began calling her Coqueline. She enrolled in the commercial dress-making register in 1955. In 1961, André and Coqueline Courrèges opened the André Courrèges Couture house, located at no. 48 Avenue Kléber, Paris. They presented their first collection of 29 pieces in Paris on August 1, 1961. Coqueline Courrèges was André Courrèges's "partner in creativity," with André acting as the "face of the company" and Coqueline ever-present in the "background."

They were married in 1966. Their daughter, Marie, was born in 1970.

Together with André, Coqueline popularised pure white trouser suits, "second skin" tights, and flat boots. She remained second in command of the company. She embodied the “Courrèges' revolution,” with its image of free independent working women. The house developed clothing using new fabrics and fibres, and Coqueline was in charge of creating these futuristic visions of fashion.

From 1995 to 2010, while André Courrèges spent his days involved with painting and sculpture, Coqueline Courrèges ran the Courrèges Design and Courrèges Parfum companies. She re-opened the factory in Pau. In 1997, the company launched a new perfume, "2020." Coqueline worked with biologists and geneticists on the clothing of the future, organising different events which combined fashion and new technologies.

Her childhood passion for cars, the result of memories of her father taking part in races driving Bugattis, led her to start designing cars in 1999. Convinced of the importance of ecological challenges, she focused on electric cars. An initial prototype was designed and presented during a Courrèges fashion show in 1968. In 2002, she introduced her first electric car, the Bulle, followed by the EXE in 2004. Between 2000 and 2008, five prototypes of 100% electric cars were created and built. The Zooop model was exhibited as part of the Bibendum Challenge organised by Michelin in June 2006 in Paris. Also in 2006, the International Salon of Inventions in Geneva awarded her a “patent” for Electric cars.

Since 2010, Coqueline Courrèges has devoted herself to the defence of André Courrèges's intellectual and moral rights, whilst simultaneously pursuing her projects involving electric transport.
