= André Courrèges =

French fashion designer (1923–2016)

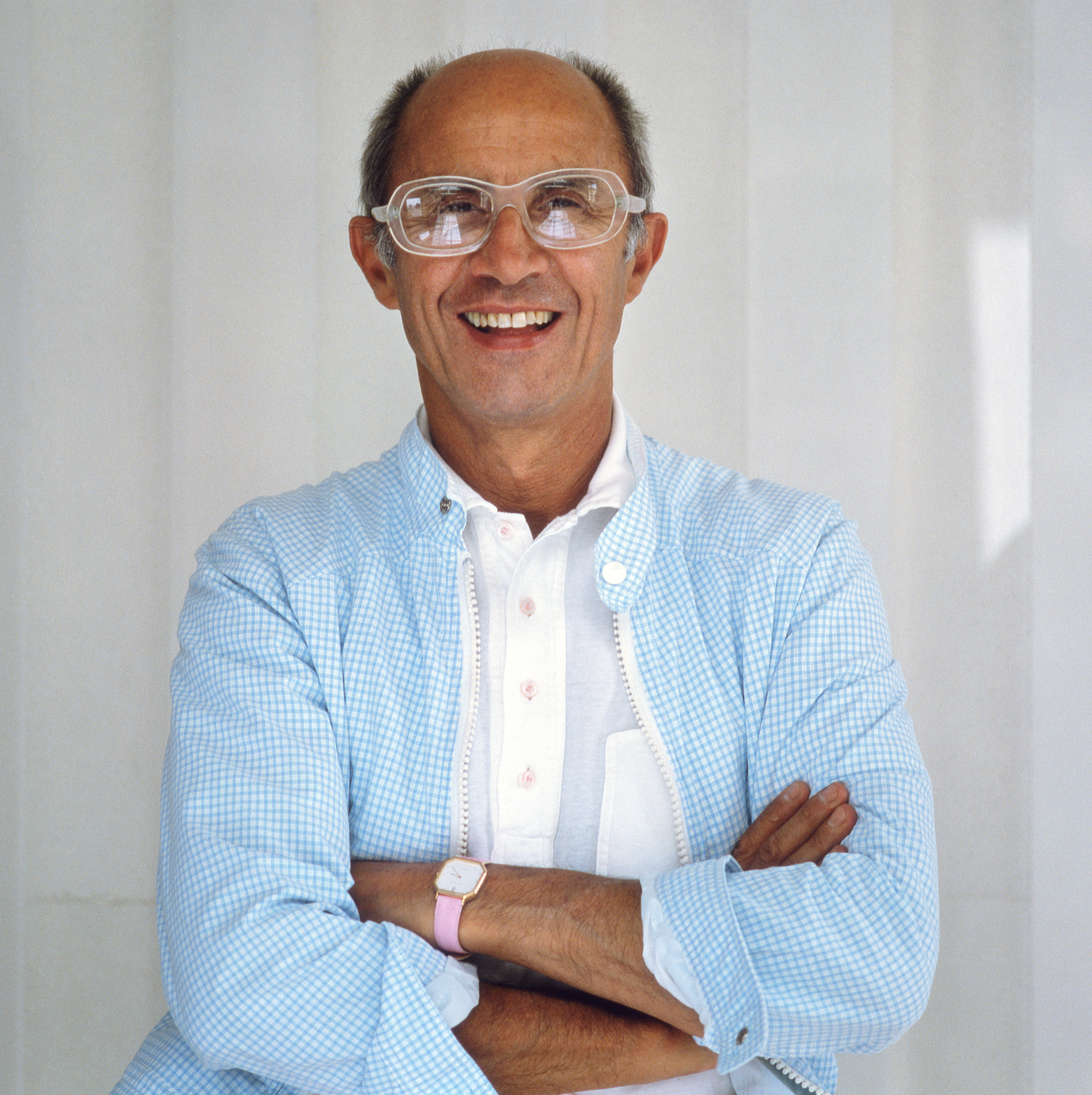
- Courrèges in 1985
- Born: 9 March 1923; Pau, Pyrénées-Atlantiques, France
- Died: 7 January 2016 (aged 92); Neuilly-sur-Seine, France
- Occupation: Fashion designer
- Known for: Space-age clothes
- Label: Courrèges
- Spouse: Coqueline Courrèges (married 1966)
- Children: 1

André Courrèges (French: [andʁe kuʁɛʒ]; 9 March 1923 – 7 January 2016) was a French fashion designer. He was particularly known for his streamlined 1960s designs influenced by modernism and futurism, exploiting modern technology and new fabrics. Courrèges defined the go-go boot and along with Mary Quant, is one of the designers credited with inventing the miniskirt. He founded the Courrèges fashion house alongside his wife Coqueline Courrèges.

== Early life ==
Courrèges was born in the city of Pau within the Bearnese region of the Pyrenees. He wanted to pursue design in art school but his father, a butler, disapproved of his passion as he wanted him to be an engineer. Courrèges attended École Nationale des Ponts-et-Chaussées (École des ponts ParisTech). During World War II, he became a pilot for the French Air Force.

== Career ==
=== Early beginnings ===
In 1945, at 22, after studying to be a civil engineer, Courrèges went to Paris to work at the fashion house Jeanne Lafaurie. A few months later, he went to work for Cristóbal Balenciaga. Courrèges worked for Balenciaga for 10 years mastering the cut and construction of garments.

=== 1961-63 ===
In 1961, Courrèges launched his own fashion house. For the first couple of years of its existence, Courrèges was known for well-tailored suits and dresses with geometric seaming, clean lines, and the standard knee-length hemlines of the time. His superbly cut trousers also attracted notice. His designs' style was shaped by Balenciaga, with garments that were well sculpted for women.

His clientele were mature and conservative women with high disposable income.

In 1963, he began to be known for extremely simple, geometric, modern designs, knee-baring skirts, trousers for women, and a predilection for white, including the "little white dress." He was considered a master tailor, backing seams with padding to give his garments a lightly upholstered look. His slim fall 1963 trousers extended in a clean line onto the top of the foot. Designers that season showed women's boots of all heights for the first time, establishing a norm that would continue in autumn collections for at least the next fifteen years. Courrèges's clothes for 1963 were often paired with flat, slim-shafted boots to the lower calf, made for him by Delicata. The white versions attracted particular attention and became known as the Courrèges boot, which evolved into the popular go-go boot. Boots of this shape would be a staple of his collections for the next two years.

=== 1964-65 ===
Courrèges would reach a peak of fame and influence with his three 1964 and '65 collections, and it is these collections for which he is most remembered. They introduced miniskirts to the haute couture, popularized pantsuits, and made flat shoes, white boots, metallic silver, and oversized glasses characteristic elements of 1960s fashion. They were still strictly haute couture collections, but they conveyed the futuristic Space Age pulse of the time with spare, adroitly tailored clothes that simultaneously gave women a sense of freedom and suggested deeper societal changes. With these collections, Courrèges intended to overcome the uncomfortable artifice that had dominated women's fashion during the 1950s. He promoted a new, more athletic body type that he felt was more in line with modern women's lives. These collections were so transformative that some fashion writers compared them to Christian Dior's 1947 Corolle collection in importance. Their influence would extend through about 1967, touching everyone from top hairdresser Vidal Sassoon to Coco Chanel, who showed her first pantsuits a few months after Courrèges introduced them to the couture in 1964. Ultra-modern US designer Rudi Gernreich was moved to shorten his skirts to mini length after seeing Courrèges's 1964 work, and both designers were early advocates of bralessness. The designer perhaps most obviously influenced was fellow Balenciaga protegé Emanuel Ungaro. During this period, Courrèges cited architects Le Corbusier and Eero Saarinen and artist Wassily Kandinsky as inspirations.

While revolutionary in the ways described, these collections were a continuation of longstanding trends toward less constricting fit that had begun in the 1950s, as well as reflecting youthful trends emanating from the UK. Courrèges's short skirts, braless torsos, waistless dresses, flat shoes, and trousers during this period were indeed freeing for women, but the clothes also continued the 1950s tendency to impose an artificial silhouette on the body via strong, 1950s-style tailoring that some described as stiff, rigid, and soldierly.

==== Spring 1964 ====
His spring 1964 collection continued to feature his distinctive boots, popularized pantsuits, and continued to promote the above-the-knee skirts that he had first brought to Paris couture the previous year. White dominated the collection. He presented simple, slightly flaring chemise dresses that hit above the knee, well above the knee when paired with his signature calf-high boots. The previous season, fall 1963, almost all designers had shown boots of various heights, but for spring of '64, Courrèges was the only designer to include boots. Their characteristic narrow cut and perfect proportions continued to win praise from the fashion press. Low-heeled pumps were also shown. His trouser outfits attracted the most attention, launching the pantsuit trend that would change societal norms during the decade. This season, his pants remained narrow but were set on the hip, creased in front, and slit over the instep to maintain a clean, unbroken line. They were paired with simple, well-tailored, geometric-looking coats, jackets, and tunics featuring prominent buttons, low-set martingales, and the pocket flaps that would become one of Courrèges's signature design details. Coats were seven-eighths length. He showed his day clothes with large, tall, mostly brimless, Space Age-looking hats. His trouser emphasis extended into evening, when he also incorporated a lot of bare skin with uncovered backs and openwork lace. These clothes were presented in a traditional, dignified salon showing with classical music and floral perfume.

==== Fall 1964 ====
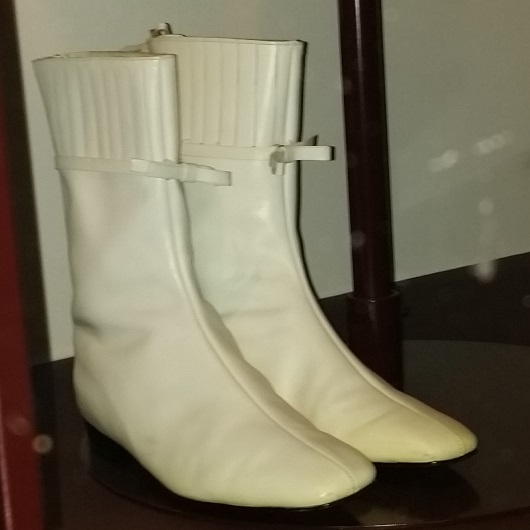
Courrèges boots, autumn 1964

His autumn 1964 collection advanced the fashion industry with modern, futuristic designs that were unheard of during the time. Trousers dominated the showing, slit over the instep like those he had shown the previous season but with a slightly narrower cut and pronounced creases in front and back. The collection included tailored coats, jackets, and tunics, which were paired with trousers or his version of the miniskirt. "He paired his shorter skirts with white or colored leather, calf-high boots that added a confident flair to the ensemble. This look became one of the most important fashion developments of the decade and was widely copied." His familiar short, geometric shift dresses were marked with a characteristic small sleeve. Coats were narrow. Jackets were longer and had deeper vents than previously. Some were marked with a hip seam. The clothes held their shape via precise tailoring and fabrics of substantial body, many double-faced, with a great deal of gabardine. He showed no regular shoes for fall '64, only boots. The boots were the same height and shape as those he'd been showing since 1963 but with pleatingor vertical stitching at the top of the shaft. As in his previous collections, the white kid ones were the most popular, but he also offered them in patent finishes, suede, lizard, and vinyl of various colors, as well as evening versions of silver sequins or ribbon-trimmed pink satin, part of an increased emphasis on evening clothes in the collection. His evening dresses were as short as his day dresses, but evening trousers dominated. Evening styles could have accents of Space Age silver, metallic pink, metallic green, and other colors, all combined with and dominated by Courrèges's signature stark white, the sheen provided by ciré finishes, lamé, sequins, geometric paillettes, and vinyl. Bareness continued to be a feature, especially in eveningclothes, where midriffs and backs were often on display. The presentation included a model getting dressed from a state of near nudity. Starting with this collection, models dressing and undressing onstage would be a mainstay of Courrèges shows that would last into the early 1970s. The most talked-about hats from the collection were helmet-like squared-off bonnets that matched the clothes and tied in the middle of the chin with a stiff geometric bow. Smaller, tightlytailored hats set on the crown of the head were also shown. Short, white gloves were included with almost everything. The models used by Courrèges this season were famously slim, muscular, and very tanned, striding out to the beat of drums.

==== Spring 1965 ====
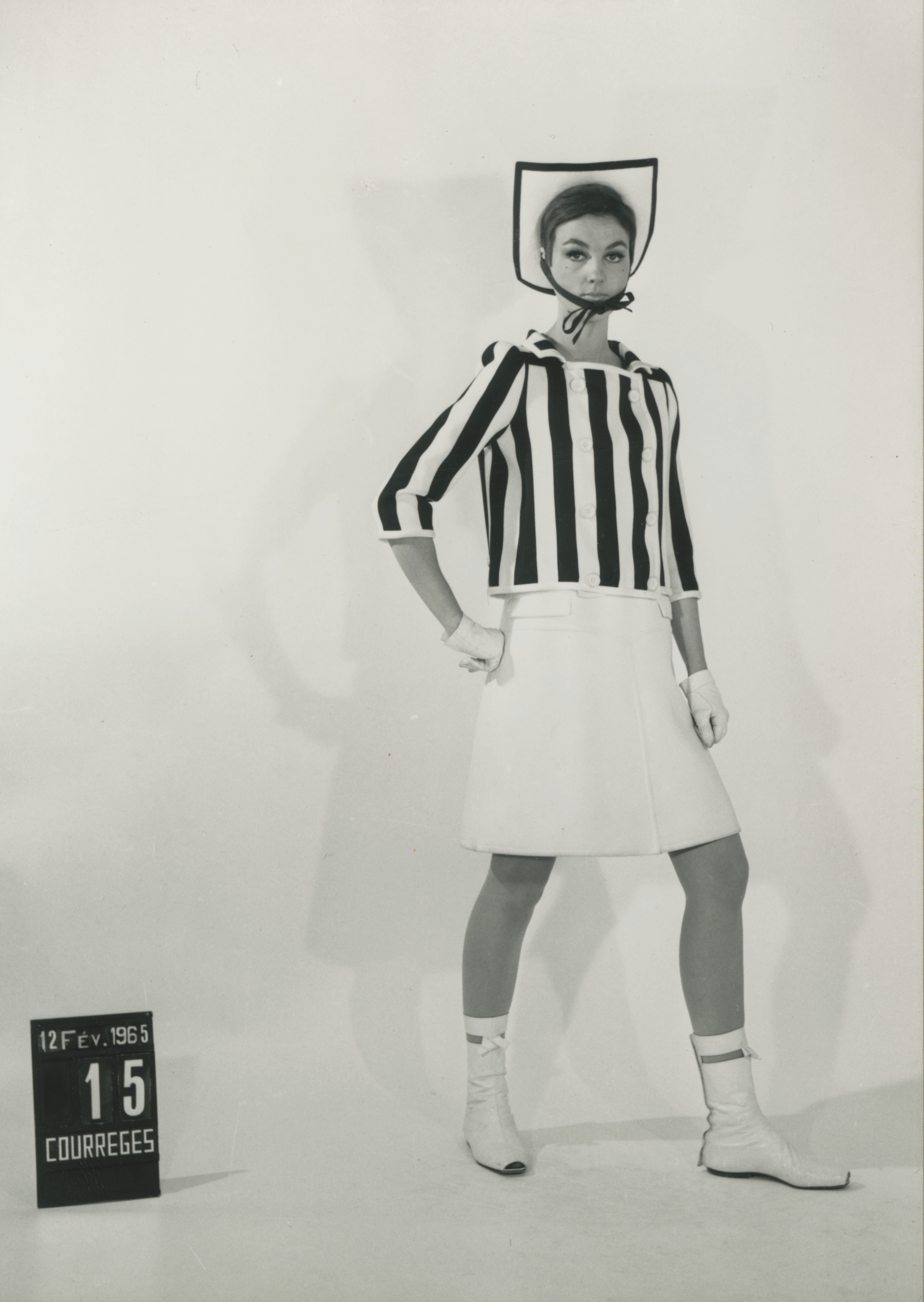
Women's suit set 15, André Courrèges, 1965

He continued with his spare, futuristic autumn 1964 styles into spring of 1965, when he shortened his skirts even more and opened the toes of his signature calf-high white boots. His spring 1965 collection also included flat Mary Jane shoes, a style that would become a mainstay for the designer through the end of the decade. His spring 1965 versions had the same open toes as the boots and featured a bow on the instep strap. Some of the boots also had a wraparound horizontal cutout near the top of the shaft, suggesting an absent ribbon. The open toe on this footwear looked like a horizontal slit or like a straight lopping off of the front of the foot piece or as if the front of the toe piece hadn't been sewn down to the sole but had just been left slightly open, the toes hidden beneath but receiving air from the open end. Other accessories included opaque white glasses with a slightly curved horizontal slit for vision; short white gloves; low, narrow hip-belts; band-edged, squared-off, cowboy- and mortarboard-looking hats with chin straps; and striped scarves to match outfits. The collection was still largely white, but included more colors, including pastels, brights, navy blue, and black, as well as some plaids and stripes. Some jackets were lined in large, graphic stripes. He made prominent use of graphic banding for emphasis, including along the inseams of trousers. His trousers this season sat lower on the hip and were no longer slit over the foot. Pockets were now mere horizontal slits, often outlined in the same color as the banding. He showed a lone pair of jodhpurs in yellow-and-white plaid. His new shorter skirts were given the most emphasis this time, still carefully tailored to a geometric trapeze shape in minimal, sleeveless or short-sleeved shift dresses, many with small, rolled, stand-away collars and lapels. Necklines could be round or square. Coats were similar but with long sleeves. Many of the jackets were of a simple waist length, establishing a style that would become characteristic of his collections into the 1970s. Most waistlines this season were dropped to hip level and marked with a thin belt. New this season were suspender dresses/suspender skirts, miniskirts with suspender-like extensions over the shoulders. These suspender skirts were often in wide horizontal stripes with matching coats or jackets and worn with sleeveless or minimally sleeved white tops. Suits were double- or single-breasted. Eveningwear was in the same shapes as daywear but with sections made to shimmer with solid coverings of tiny sequins. This season's runway strip scene involved a pink wool suit being removed to reveal Courrèges undergarments consisting of sleeveless top, hip-slung short shorts, and calf-high socks, all in a transparent fabric embroidered with white dots. This spring 1965 collection built on the reputation of the previous two collections to achieve an astounding level of influence.

Controversy over who created the idea for the miniskirt revolves around Courrèges and Mary Quant. Courrèges explicitly claimed to have invented it, accusing his London rival to the claim, Quant, of merely "commercialising" it. Courrèges presented short skirts (four inches above the knee) in January 1965 for that year's Spring/Summer collection. He had presented "above-the-knee" skirts in the previous year, with his August 1964 haute couture presentation proclaimed the "best show seen so far" for that season by The New York Times. Valerie Steele has stated that Courrèges was designing short skirts as early as 1961, although she champions Quant's claim to have created the miniskirt first as being more convincingly supported by evidence. Others, such as Jess Cartner-Morley of The Guardian explicitly credit Courrèges with having invented the miniskirt. The Independent also stated that "Courreges was the inventor of the miniskirt: at least in his eyes and those of the French fashion fraternity ... The argument came down to high fashion vs street fashion and to France versus Britain – there's no conclusive evidence either way." British Vogue considered John Bates the true inventor of the miniskirt, rather than Courrèges or Quant.

Courrèges's favoured materials included plastics such as vinyl and stretch fabrics like Lycra. While he preferred white and silver, he often used flashes of citrus colour, and the predominantly white designs in his August 1964 show were tempered with touches of his signature clear pink, a "bright stinging" green, various shades of brown from dark to pale, and poppy red.

Alongside short skirts, Courrèges was renowned for his trouser suits, cut-out backs and midriffs, all designed for a new type of athletic, active young woman. Steele has described Courrèges's work as a "brilliant couture version of youth fashion." One of Courrèges's most distinctive looks, a knit bodystocking with a gabardine miniskirt slung around the hips, was widely copied and plagiarised, much to his chagrin, and it would be 1967 before he again held a press showing for his work.

=== 1965-66 Hiatus ===
Disturbed by the uncontrolled copying of his fall 1964 and spring 1965 lines, Courrèges declined to present a fall 1965 collection and wouldn't show again until 1967. He produced no full collections for fall 1965, spring 1966, or fall 1966, though he did make a few garments for private clients, showing a very small collection for them in spring of 1966. He was bothered especially by the low quality of the copies he'd seen, feeling that the average woman was being denied high quality because of shoddy imitations. He also became concerned about affordability, resolving to create a lower-priced ready-to-wear line so that more people could have access to his work. Like a number of particularly young designers of the time, he began to see haute couture, with its multiple fittings and high cost, as outdated and out of step with modern women's lives and with economic realities. He spent his time trying to secure manufacturers who could produce high-quality, lower-cost garments for a new ready-to-wear line that Courrèges would call Couture Future, to be sold in a new boutique downstairs from his couture salon, which was being moved from Kleber Avenue to François I Street in Paris, enabled by backing from French beauty concern l'Oréal.

=== 1967-71 ===
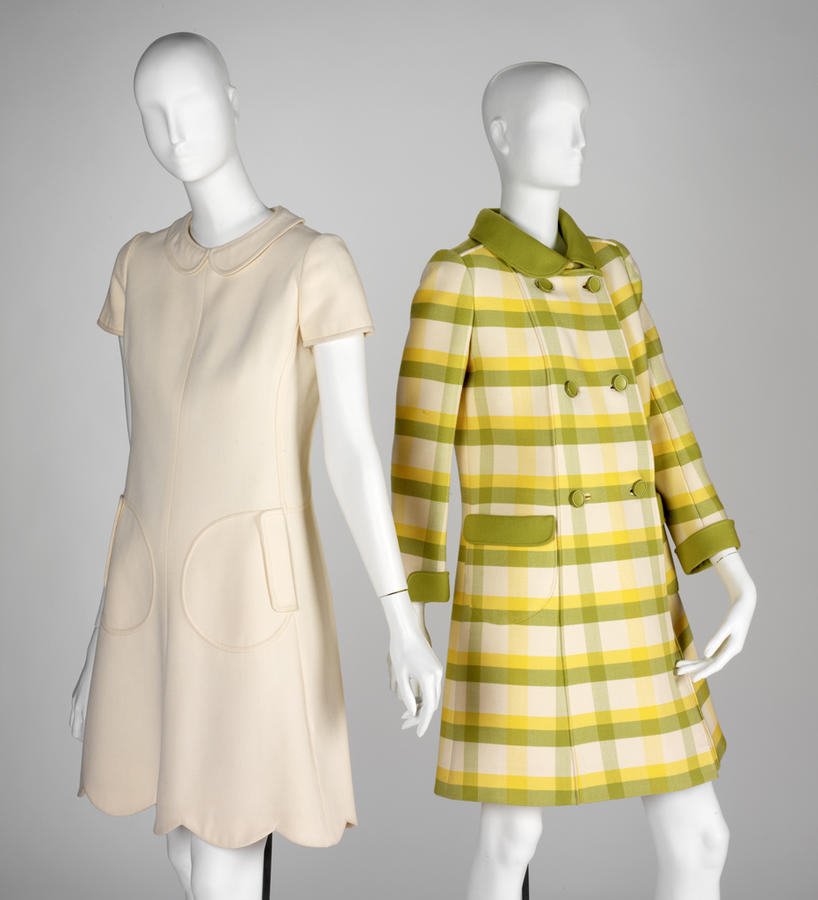
André Courrèges dress and coat, c. 1966 (RISD Museum)

In February 1967, Courrèges resumed his couture showings after a year and ahalf of not producing collections. The same month, he introduced a ready-to-wear line to be sold in a new boutique downstairs from his Paris couture salon, which had moved from Kleber Avenue to François I Street. He referred to his ready-to-wear line as Couture Future and would initially only sell it at his flagship boutique, not debuting new ready-to-wear styles via fashion shows but instead adding new styles continuously to the boutique stock. The following year, he began presenting his ready-to-wear line mixed in with his couture garments in a single fashion show each season. While the new ready-to-wear line would be roughly a quarter the price of his couture garments and thus accessible to more women, it was still costly.

His 1967 through '71 collections looked very different from the 1964-65 clothes that had brought him fame. Skirts were still mini length – even more so, in fact; shoes were still flat; and there was still a lot of white and a futuristic look to everything, but lines were now more rounded and curvilinear, there was more color, and there was less stiffness. Observers described the new clothes as softer, "sweeter," and more "girlish" than his famous 1964-65 creations. Dress and coat shapes were now most often of an A-line, paper doll-like silhouette that flared from the ribcage to a mini or micromini hem. There was now even more of a child-like look than there had been when he showed baby bonnet-looking headgear in 1964, as he presented occasional infant-style rompers and his models painted big freckles on their faces and wore their hair in little girl-style ponytails on either side of the head. Courrèges continued to favor short hair, showing geometric-looking, blunt-cut, chin-length, crayon-vivid Dynel wigs from 1968 to 1970.

He used more medium-build and rounded models than the slim, tanned, athletic models he had famously used for his shows in 1964 and '65, now having them smile and dance onstage, usually to percussive jazz music, instead of striding soberly, a feature that he would maintain until 1973.

Diagnostic of this 1967 to '71 period for Courrèges was an emphasis on jumpsuits instead of pantsuits. Notable were ribknit bodystockings/jumpsuits, some footless, some with feet, that he referred to as catsuits. He intended these ribbed bodystockings/catsuits to be the basis of a dress scheme, a background for his other garments. For summer, they were offered in shorts lengths. The use of tights and bodystockings as background garments was a trend of the time that fit well with Courrèges's emphasis on functionality in dress.

As with his pre-hiatus collections, he used lots of welt seaming and geometric construction. There was continuity also in his 1967-71 inclusion of waist-length jackets, which he had debuted in 1965 but now cut somewhat more like jean jackets in both short-sleeve and long-sleeved styles, a style he would present well into the 1970s. He also showed waist-length capes. From 1967 to '69, he scalloped the edges of many of his garments, as had Cardin in the mid-sixties, giving them a slightly frilly appearance that still managed to look geometric. He favored flower motifs in 1967-68, somewhat similar to Mary Quant's trademark use of daisies and paralleling the emphasis on flowers in the era's youth culture.

Courrèges was one of a group of designers (Rudi Gernreich, Paco Rabanne, Emanuel Ungaro, etc) in the late sixties who rejected moves toward ethnic, hippie, and revival styles, which they referred to as nostalgic, and continued to show futuristic designs in almost exclusively mini and micromini lengths. Courrèges's expressions of this tendency included continued use of stark white; circular and curvilinear geometry; lots of zippers, tabs, and snaps; and prominent use of plastic and vinyl, though traditional fabrics of more substantial body like wools and cottons still made up the bulk of his textiles. In addition to vinyl, he used leather, especially for coats, some of which were wet-look shiny. 1970 saw Courrèges using leather and patent leather accents in the form of piping and banding, including on his knit bodystockings/catsuits and on his knee socks. That year, it was unclear to fashion-watchers whether the mini-favoring modernists would prevail or the midi-pushing nostalgics, and Courrèges, Gernreich, et al were briefly focused on as potential leaders again, as they had been in the mid-sixties.

Courrèges added a few longer skirt lengths beginning in 1969, when he showed some calf-length evening dresses that were just extended versions of his shorter dress shapes. His spring 1969 collection also featured solid metal microminis with matching metal breastbands that were as futuristic as but very different than the well known 1966-67 Paco Rabanne trapeze minidresses that had consisted of separate small plates of metal. In 1970, the year the fashion world tried to impose calf-length hemlines on everyone, Courrèges included knee lengths, calf lengths, and ankle lengths in both his daywear and eveningwear, though minis and microminis still dominated his offerings.

Courrèges's main pant styles of this period also followed the trends of the time, starting off with his signature long, sleek trousers but expanding into flared and even hiphugger bellbottom styles by the end of the period, particularly in 1968-70. He also showed lower-thigh-length shorts styles. He reflected the era's ethnic trends somewhat when in 1967 he included a jumpsuit with harem legs and when in 1969 he showed a few pairs of full, knee-length pants that he called knickers, a trouser trend of the time, but his were full enough to look like bloomers, zouaves, or cossack pants. He showed short shorts under maxicoats and maxidresses when the hot pants trend peaked in 1971.

It was at the end of the 1960s that Courrèges really maximized his use of cutouts, placing circular cutouts in the center of the chest, the center of the stomach, on the sides, or down the legs that allowed the ribknit bodystocking or bare skin to show beneath. This was a trend that had been more widespread during Courrèges's hiatus year of 1966, when Pierre Cardin may have been its biggest proponent, but it continued to be seen among Space Age designers like Courrèges and Ungaro.The trend toward bareness and nudity of the time was also acknowledged by Courrèges in see-through fabrics, runway toplessness, and backs so low they revealed the derrière, as well as more traditional devices like plunging surplice and keyhole necklines. In 1971, he introduced a bare cut to some of his tops that resembled the top of overalls, with an open-sided front panel and loose straps over the shoulders, a style he would continue to show through the mid-seventies.

His boots from 1967 to 1970 were still completely flat, but now mostly knee-high and fitted, in the dominant style of the time, very different from the 1963-65 boot style that had made him famous. In 1970, he showed some boots with fuller shafts, as boot trends were moving in that direction in the new decade.The other footwear he showed in this 1967-71 period continued to be the flat Mary Janes that he had first included in 1965, sometimes referred to as slippers. These boots and Mary Janes would change design details from season to season, broad and round-toed one season, with large petal-like flaps the next, squared the next, trimmed in metal the next, and even with light-up plastic accents in 1970. For summer, he favored knee socks more than boots, with sheer ones for evening, also showing them for fall, and he included some over-the-knee stockings.

During this period, he made playful, futuristic, oversized eyewear a characteristic element of his shows, creating lenses that looked like huge cartoon eyes (1969) or huge eyelids edged in cartoonish eyelashes (1970). In 1968, he introduced his first purse designs to his ready-to-wear line, and in 1969 his first swimsuits.

In 1970, a second, even lower-priced ready-to-wear line was added called Hyperbole, as Courrèges continued to be concerned about the accessibility of his work. He would still maintain his made-to-order haute couture line, officially renaming it Prototypes in 1971.

In 1967 Courrèges married Coqueline Barrière, his design assistant. They had met while working together at Balenciaga, and worked together as a husband and wife team for the rest of his life.

=== 1972-79 ===
In 1968 Courrèges sold a share of his company to L'Oréal in order to finance his expansion, which, by 1972, included 125 boutiques around the world. That year, Courrèges was commissioned to design staff uniforms for the Munich Olympics. He began offering menswear in 1973. He also developed fragrances such as Empreinte, Courrèges Homme, Eau de Courrèges, Courrèges Blue, Sweet Courrèges, and Generation Courrèges.

His womenswear from 1972 through '79 conformed to some extent to the trends of the time, but he remained devoted to shorter hems than most and to continued use of plastic, metallic silver, and white during this era of longer skirts, natural fibers, and earthtones. The question in the year 1970 of whether ethnic, nostalgic looks or geometric, modern/futuristic looks would prevail had been answered, as longer lengths, ethnic/gypsy/peasant influences, quiet classics, and sturdy workwear like blue jeans became the norm.

Courrèges adapted to this new environment by lengthening his shortest daytime skirts to just above the knee (which was considered mini-length by the mid-seventies), including a few knee-covering day lengths (just below the knee in 1974, to the calf in 1977), softening his silhouette via some fuller cuts, reflecting trends in trouser shape by showing flared pants in the early seventies and pegged pants toward the end of the period, employing layering, incorporating some softer colors, and accessorizing with soft berets, mufflers, and some boots that had the deep-toned, luggage-quality leather look of the high-fashion boots of the time. During the mid-seventies, he even gave up his health-based adherence to flat shoes and began showing high heels. His 1967-71 focus on a knit bodystocking-based dress scheme was gone by the end of 1972. Updated versions of his longstandingwaist-length jackets continued as versatile items throughout his collections.

Though softening and increased color had also been part of his 1967-71 direction, fashion writers seemed to forget about that and instead compared his 1970s work only to his 1964-65 peak-of-fame collections, writing as though he had abruptly gone from the angular tailoring and geometric shapes of his 1964-65 lines to the fuller, softer garments he was showing in the 1970s.

His fashion shows changed during this period. They were still showy spectacles with lots of dancing in 1972, but the dancing was gone by the end of 1973, and the shows were more subdued by the end of the decade. He continued to present his haute couture and ready-to-wear lines together in a single show each season.

By 1972, he had followed Pierre Cardin, Valentino, and some others in placing his logo visibly on many of his garments, most notably sweaters, which quickly became status symbols and profitable mainstays of his output. He said that the initials AC stood not for his name alone but for André and Coqueline, his partner. In 1978, he changed to putting only his name, spelled out, on the outside of his clothes instead. As a designer who continued to favor short skirts, Courrèges easily segued into designing tenniswear as that sport increased in popularity during the decade.

At the same time, he always included a few pieces that harkened back to his mid-sixties apex, like white shift dresses, garments with contrasting band edging, and calf-high white boots, now in different cuts than in his mid-sixties heyday. His continued prominent use of plastic, vinyl, metallic silver, zippers, snaps, and large, unusual-looking plastic eyewear gained him a reputation as something of an eccentric, as did an unexpected new development from him: extravagant evening gowns in his couture line. Some of these evening gowns were actual ballgownswith enormous skirts, considered anachronistic during the very casual, minimally constructed 1970s, a time when the most formal evening dresses were usually sedate-colored, understated, spaghetti-strap slipdresses (impressive versions of which Courrèges also produced at the time) and many women wore trousers and jeans even for dressy occasions. Fellow former Space Age designer Pierre Cardin indulged in similar individualistic experimentation during this period. Courrèges's ballgownswere in both full-skirted shapes and more experimental silhouettes and incorporated a lot of plastic, large stiff ruffles, and even hoops. His attempt to reflect the period's blouson trend in a multi-level, bloused, sequin-trimmed evening creation of complex construction was particularly notable.

As fashion trends of the time moved toward blousy, voluminous, even oversized shapes and most designers' bareness came to involve things like blouses sliding off the shoulder, unbuttoned tops, and open-mesh fabrics in loose shapes, Courrèges showed through 1975 the open-sided bib-front top cuts with loose shoulder straps that he had debuted in 1971. He also continued to present short shorts for both day and evening, long after the 1971 peak of interest in hot pants.

By 1979, his skirt hems were almost all at the knee. In 1978 and '79, signs appeared among the avant-garde and then mainstream designers of a sixties revival, and Courrèges reintroduced some of his most famous styles from the mid-sixties, adding more primary color for interest.

At the end of the 1970s, Courrèges signed licensing agreements for lines of several garments, from shoes to towels.

=== 1980+ ===
In early 1983, Courrèges worked with the Japanese motor company Honda to design special editions of their TACT motor scooter. By 2005, Itokin held the Japanese ready-to-wear license for the Courrèges brand, with a retail value of €50 million. By this point, Coqueline Courrèges had succeeded her husband as artistic director for the brand, Courrèges having retired in 1995 following their successful reclamation of the brand in 1994 despite several ownership changes.

In 1984 Courrèges designed the Peugeot "Courrèges" bicycle, a limited-edition model in two colourways – pale blue, and white with pink colour pops, and with matching panniers, chain guard, handlebar grips and mudguards, with Sturmey-Archer hub gears.

In 2011, André and Coqueline Courrèges sold the Courrèges brand for more than 10 million euros ($13.05 million) to twoYoung & Rubicam advertising executives, Jacques Bungert and Frédéric Torloting. By 2012, total revenue for the brand was about 20 million euros.

In 2014, Groupe Artemis, the personal investment vehicle of François-Henri Pinault, purchased a minority stake in Courrège. In 2018 Groupe Artemis became the majority shareholder of the brand. Nicholas di Felice was appointed creative director in September 2020, and had been credited with revitalizing the brand and bringing it back to relevance; he stepped down in March 2026. On March 30, 2026 Drew Henry was announced as the new artistic director of the house.

== Space design ==
Courrège's Spring 1964 collection established his impact on the fashion industry and named him the Space Age designer. The line consisted of "architecturally-sculpted, double-breasted coats with contrasting trim, well-tailored, sleeveless or short-sleeved minidresses with dropped waistlines and detailed welt seaming, and tunics worn with hipster pants". A notable look was the linear minidresses with revolutionary tailoring with cut-out panels that displayed waists, midriffs and backs. Courrège had strong beliefs within the liberation of fashion. He emphasized that "A woman's body must be hard and free, not soft and harnessed. The harness – the girdle and bra – is the chain of the slave." Which is why his cut-out panel garments were worn without bras.

Accessories were inspired by astronauts' equipment such as goggles, helmets and flat boots. White and metallic colour ways were implemented to emphasise the futuristic collection. He utilised unconventional materials such as metal, plastic and PVC which was unusual for couture ateliers. The entire collection was celebrated with British Vogue announced that 1964 was "the year of Courrèges". The New York Times described him as "the brightest blaze of the year" to emphasise the change from the little black dress to the white dress. Designers such as Pierre Cardin and Paco Rabanne took influences towards "future" fashion looks. With new popularity, his designs trickled down to mass production companies that created affordable designs similar to Courrèges.

== Long-term impact ==
By the early 1970s, some of the ideas Courrèges had been among the first to propose in the early sixties had become society-wide reality, most notably women wearing pants in all settings, from daily activities to the office to formal functions. Courrèges's concerted effort to promote this change in women's dress, particularly in 1964, had been taken up by many other designers during the sixties, followed by increasing numbers of women, whose street dress then inspired Yves Saint Laurent in both his formal 1966 "Le Smoking" women's trouser suits and his trouser-dominated 1968 collections, both of which offered a flaring cut that women found especially appealing. At the close of the sixties, women were successfully challenging dress codes at institutions throughout society, so that by 1972 far more trousers than skirts could be seen on city streets, a sea change in the sartorial landscape largely instigated by Courrèges that still holds today.

A less long-lasting Courrèges triumph was his advocacy of bralessness. Both he and Rudi Gernreich had begun promoting bralessness in the early 1960s, part of a broader move toward discarding the constricting and uncomfortable undergarments that women had been expected to wear for decades and that had been especially burdensome in the 1950s with that decade's bullet bras, corsets, girdles, and waist-cinchers. By the late 1960s, the women's liberation movement advocated going without bras as well, and in the 1970s large numbers of women did stop wearing them, considering bras just another uncomfortable traditional undergarment that wasn't really needed. Bralessness remained widespread through much of the 1970s. The bras that were worn were only lightly constructed and followed the lead of Rudi Gernreich's mid-1960s no-bra bra. The final two years of the seventies would see a designer-led reversal of this trend, however, as designers began to show revived 1940s and '50s silhouettes that they paired with traditionally seductive-looking bras in materials like black lace, sometimes worn on their own under low-buttoning shoulder-padded suit jackets. During the eighties, with bras now much more comfortable than the ones Courrèges had been opposed to and including the versatile sports bra, bralessness receded into seventies nostalgia and even some highly structured wired forms came back into use, a norm that continues into the present day. During the seventies, though, Courrèges's early sixties endorsement of bralessness had been taken up by much of female society.

== Later life and death ==
Courrèges suffered from Parkinson's disease for the last 30 years of his life. He died on 7 January 2016 aged 92, in Neuilly-sur-Seine outside Paris and was survived by his wife and their daughter.

His death was published in notable media outlets and many designers went to celebrate his life online. President François Hollande went to Twitter to say, "A revolutionary designer, André Courrèges made his mark on haute couture using geometric shapes and new materials." Courrèges was a designer who looked to the future. He predicted the idea of healthy living and toned bodies through his book in 1982. Carla Sozzani, the owner of 10 Corso Como stated that, "It changed the concept of couture, marking the turn of fashion into a new era."
