= Courrèges =

French fashion house

Courreges Distribution SAS
- Trade name: Courrèges
- Industry: Fashion
- Founded: 1961
- Founder: André Courrèges; Coqueline Courrèges; Marcel Leyrat
- Number of locations: 9 (2026)
- Key people: Drew Henry (artistic director); Marie Leblanc (chief executive officer)
- Owner: André and Coqueline Courrèges (1961–2011); Marcel Leyrat (1961–1965); L’Oréal (1968–1982); Itokin (1982–1990); Epargne Developpement (1990–1994); Jacques Bungert, Frédéric Torloting (2011–2018); Groupe Artémis (2015–present)
- Website: courreges.com

Courrèges (French: [kuʁɛʒ]) is a French luxury fashion house founded in 1961 by André Courrèges, Coqueline Courrèges, and Marcel Leyrat. The house is well-known for its use of vinyl, first in the Spring 1964 Moon Girl collection; one of the 1960s most influential fashion collections and a key influence to "Space Age style". Courrèges produces a range of products including ready-to-wear, accessories, footwear, and fragrance, from 1961 to 1986 the house also produced couture.

Since 2018, Courrèges has been under the control of Pinault family-owned Artémis. "Revived" under the artistic direction of Nicolas Di Felice from 2020, Di Felice resigned in 2026 and was replaced by Drew Henry.

== History ==
=== Under André and Coqueline Courrèges (1961–1995) ===
On 6 October 1961, André Courrèges, Jacqueline Barrière (later known as Coqueline Barrière and after marriage as Coqueline Courrèges), and Marcel Leyrat, founded the couture house of Courrèges. Prior to the October founding Courrèges creations were already being made for a select clientele. All three were colleagues the house of Balenciaga (Courrèges and Barrière in couture and Leyrat head of perfumes). Courrèges exited the house of Balenciaga in January 1961 to create Courrèges. Courrèges had served as the "number one assistant" to Cristóbal Balenciaga and reportedly exited the house following a dispute with Mademoiselle Renée (directrice of Balenciaga) over the promotion of another designer. Prior to working at Balenciaga, Courrèges worked with Jeanne Lafaurie.

Barrière purchased an apartment at 48 Avenue Kléber that would be transformed into the Courrèges atelier. Cristòbal Balenciaga closely supported the house after its founding encouraging an expansion into larger premises and even offering to introduce his own customers to Courrèges.

The first Courrèges collection was shown on 31 July 1961. The houses first commercially successful collection was shown in August 1964. Diana Vreeland, editor-in-chief of Vogue praised the collection and orders could not be fulfilled. Emanuel Ungaro worked for Courrèges from 1 June 1964 until Spring 1965, leaving to begin his own fashion house. It was then revealed that Courrèges would not show a July collection. At this point Courrèges had moved to 40 Rue François Premier (previously home to the Parisian atelier of Simonetta Colonna di Cesarò), the premises was spread across two floors and had a complete work staff.

Leyrat sold his shares in October 1965 and exited the company. Following the exit of Leyrat the company tried to solicit "moneyed" clients such as Lee Radziwill. On 13 October, WWD revealed that there were plans to sell the house to L'Oréal. In November, it was reported that Procter & Gamble would also be involved in the sale of the house, who at the time were planning to acquire L'Oréal.

L'Oréal formed Courrèges Parfums, S.A. in December 1965.

In January 1966, the press was informed that for a second season in a row Courrèges would not show a couture collection.

However, the brand shuttered the couture line in 1967 and transitioned to ready-to-wear with the line taking on the name of 'couture future', which is what the house has produced since.

Half of the company was sold to L’Oréal in 1968. This was done to finance the business' expansion.

A menswear line was launched in 1973. However it was discontinued in 1986.

In 1982 L’Oréal sold their stake to Japanese company Itokin. Under their ownership André Courrèges "lost control" of the house and profits declined until it was sold to Epargne Developpement in 1990 (owned by Caisse d'Epargne). The brand returned with a boutique in Bloomingdale's and a party at the Paramount Hotel.

The shares in the company in 1993 were André Courrèges Design (65%; owned by André, Coqueline and family) and Epargne Partenaires (35%). At this time Jean-Charles de Castelbajac was appointed artistic director, working alongside André producing women’s ready-to-wear collections. However after two seasons he left the house to launch his own fashion brand.

In 1994 the André and Coqueline Courrèges regained control of the house. André retired the year after and Coqueline became artistic director.

=== Coqueline Courrèges, 1995–2010 ===
The brand's worldwide turnover in 1996 was 2.4 billion francs. (Note: Around €548 million in 2024)

From August 1997 the company moved its operations (couture, perfumes, licences) to 40 rue François 1er, where it has been located since. At the time the house had 100 employees.

The brand was sold by the Courrèges family in 2011 to Jacques Bungert and Frédéric Torloting. At the time only the Paris Rue François flagship was open. At the time the brand was mainly operating off of the profits from its licence agreements in Japan, before the sale houses team had been designing collections (designed by Coqueline Courrèges) but they were not manufactured or distributed. In September 2011 a limited edition water bottle was released in collaboration with Evian.

Courrèges was relaunched in November 2011 with an online site operated by Vente-Privée.com and sold a collection of updated items which were 'house classics'. These were also sold at Colette.

=== Sébastien Meyer and Arnaud Vaillant, 2015–2017 ===
Bungert and Torloting sold a stake to Groupe Artémis in 2015 however sold all shares in the company to Artémis in 2018. The Pau factory was closed in 2017.

=== Yolanda Zobel, 2018–2020 ===
Yolanda Zobel was revealed as the new artistic director in February 2018 she had previously worked for Acne Studios, Jil Sander, Chloé and more. Under her direction she stopped using the houses iconic vinyl material over sustainability concerns and aimed to make Courrèges plastic free.

In January 2020, Zobel exited the house.

=== Nicolas de Felice, 2020–2026 ===
Adrien Da Maia was appointed CEO in March 2020. Nicolas de Felice was appointed artistic director in September 2020 and presented his first collection in March 2021. de Felice previously worked under Nicolas Ghesquière at both Balenciaga and Louis Vuitton. Under Da Maia's and de Felice's control the brand started gaining traction in the fashion industry with more than half of its customers (who purchased de Felices debut collection) being new. Benjamin Simmenauer (professor at Institut Français de la Mode) said in an interview with Vogue Business that “He [de Felice] has brought back the youth component of the brand identity, stripping it from its more conceptual or avant garde elements.” Whilst Laure Hériard Dubreuil said “The reinvented Courrèges by Nicolas di Felice is exactly what we want right now — heritage, modern, sexy, chic, Parisienne, worldwide — a new twist to the perfect [post-lockdown] uniform,”.

Under Da Maia's and de Felice's control the brand started re-gaining traction in the fashion industry with more than half of its customers (who purchased de Felices debut collection) being new. Benjamin Simmenauer (professor at Institut Français de la Mode) said in an interview with Vogue Business that “He [de Felice] has brought back the youth component of the brand identity, stripping it from its more conceptual or avant garde elements.” Whilst Laure Hériard Dubreuil said “The reinvented Courrèges by Nicolas di Felice is exactly what we want right now — heritage, modern, sexy, chic, Parisienne, worldwide — a new twist to the perfect [post-lockdown] uniform,”.

The house re-launched its menswear line in 2021.

In a 2021 interview with L'Officiel Paris, de Felice when asked about his vision for Courrèges said “When you remodel a house, you must obviously respect its heritage. But there is also a moment when it is your own vision that you have to put forward. I offer simple things. I have no intellectual pretensions, even if I think a lot.”

An exhibit dedicated to the artistic struggles of the LGBTQI+ community was developed at Centre Pompidou in collaboration with Courrèges called “Over the Rainbow”.

The brands revenue doubled in 2023, continuing strong growth under Di Felice.

In March 2026, it was announced that Di Felice would be stepping down from his role to "focus on personal projects.". Drew Henry was then appointed to the position of artistic director, with his first collection set to be presented in September 2026. Henry began has career at Celine, moving to work at the house of Phoebe Philo, then at JW Anderson, and most recently working at Burberry under Daniel Lee.

=== Boutiques ===
The first independent Courrèges boutique outside of the 40 Rue François Premier premises, was a Courrèges Future boutique opened on Rue du Faubourg Saint-Honoré in 1969. As of 1972 there were 125 Courrèges boutiques in operation around the world.

During the labels 1970s peak up to 30 Courrèges stores operated in the United States alone. Expansion into the country began with a boutique on Los Angeles' Rodeo Drive in 1973. A year later a boutique opened on the corner of Madison Avenue and 57th Street in New York City. The fifteenth American boutique opened in August 1977 at Riverside Square in Hackensack. Store-within-a-store boutiques once operated within Bonwit Teller (New York City), Bloomingdale's (New York City), I. Magnin (Los Angeles, San Francisco), Jackson Graves (Minneapolis), Sakowitz (Houston), and more. Following the release of a capsule collection for Nordstrom in October 2024, a pop-up boutique operated till December 2024 in the New York City flagship at Broadway/West 57th Street.

In March 1972, a Lily Simon boutique stocking only Courrèges opened at Westmount Square in Montreal, Canada.

The 40 Rue François Premier flagship was redesigned in late 2020 by Belgian architect Bernard Dubois.

A boutique opened within Galeries Lafayette on Boulevard Haussmann in September 2021. In the same year a boutique opened at 119 rue Vieille du Temple in Le Marais, the Marais boutique would relocate to 27 rue des Francs-Bourgeois in 2024.

In September 2022, a Bernard Dubois-designed boutique opened on Grand Street in New York City. The second contemporary-era American boutique opened at Los Angeles' South Coast Plaza in 2024. Courrèges previously operated at South Coast Plaza from 1975 to 1982.

A South Korean store-within-a-store boutique opened at the Shinsegae department store in Gangnam in 2023. In 2024, a store-within-a-store boutique opened at the Shinsegae branch in Busan.

Courrèges Rive Gauche opened on Place Michel Debré in November 2024.

As of 2026, nine Courrèges boutiques operate around the world in France (Paris - 40 rue François Premier, Paris - Le Marais, Paris - Rive Gauche, Paris - Galeries Lafayette Haussmann, Paris - Printemps Haussmann), South Korea (Seoul - Shinsegae Gangnam, Busan - Shinsegae Centum City), and the United States (New York City - SoHo, Los Angeles - South Coast Plaza).

== Fragrance ==
In October 1965 a distribution deal was signed with L'Oréal for the brands first perfume. The first fragrance Empreinte was released in-house in 1971 (by this time L'Oréal was the companies largest shareholder). The perfume was later discontinued but reintroduced in 2021.

The first fragrance for men Amerique was launched in 1977. In 1983 when L'Oréal sold their 50% stake in the fashion house they retained 100% ownership of Courrèges Parfums. However the company was later sold to a Swiss organisation.

== Governance ==
=== Artistic direction ===
- André Courrèges (couture from 1961 to 1986; women's ready-to-wear from 1967 to 1995 and men's ready-to-wear from 1973 to 1986)
- Coqueline Courrèges (couture from 1961 to 1986; women's ready-to-wear from 1967 to 2010)
- Jean-Charles de Castelbajac (women's ready-to-wear from 1993 to 1994)
- Sébastien Meyer and Arnaud Vaillant (women's ready-to-wear from 2015 to 2017)
- Yolanda Zobel (women's ready-to-wear from 2018 to 2020)
- Nicolas Di Felice (women's ready-to-wear from 2020 to 2026 and men's ready-to-wear from 2021 to 2026)
- Drew Henry (women's ready-to-wear since 2020 and men's ready-to-wear since 2026)
