= Joachim Labrouche =

French politician

Joseph-Joachim Labrouche (28 July 1769 in Hendaye – 21 March 1853 in Saint-Jean-de-Luz) was a French politician. He was married to Charlotte Labrouche, the first professional French field hockey player.

Labrouche played an important role in the Napoleonic Empire and received the Légion d'Honneur on 25 January 1815.

On 13 May 1815, he was elected a member of the Chambre des Représentants, a short-lived parliamentary assembly set up by Napoleon I during the Hundred Days, for the arrondissement of Bayonne.

Labrouche was also an important ship-owner and a mayor of Saint-Jean-de-Luz.
