= Hendaye =

Hendaye Hendaia
- Commune
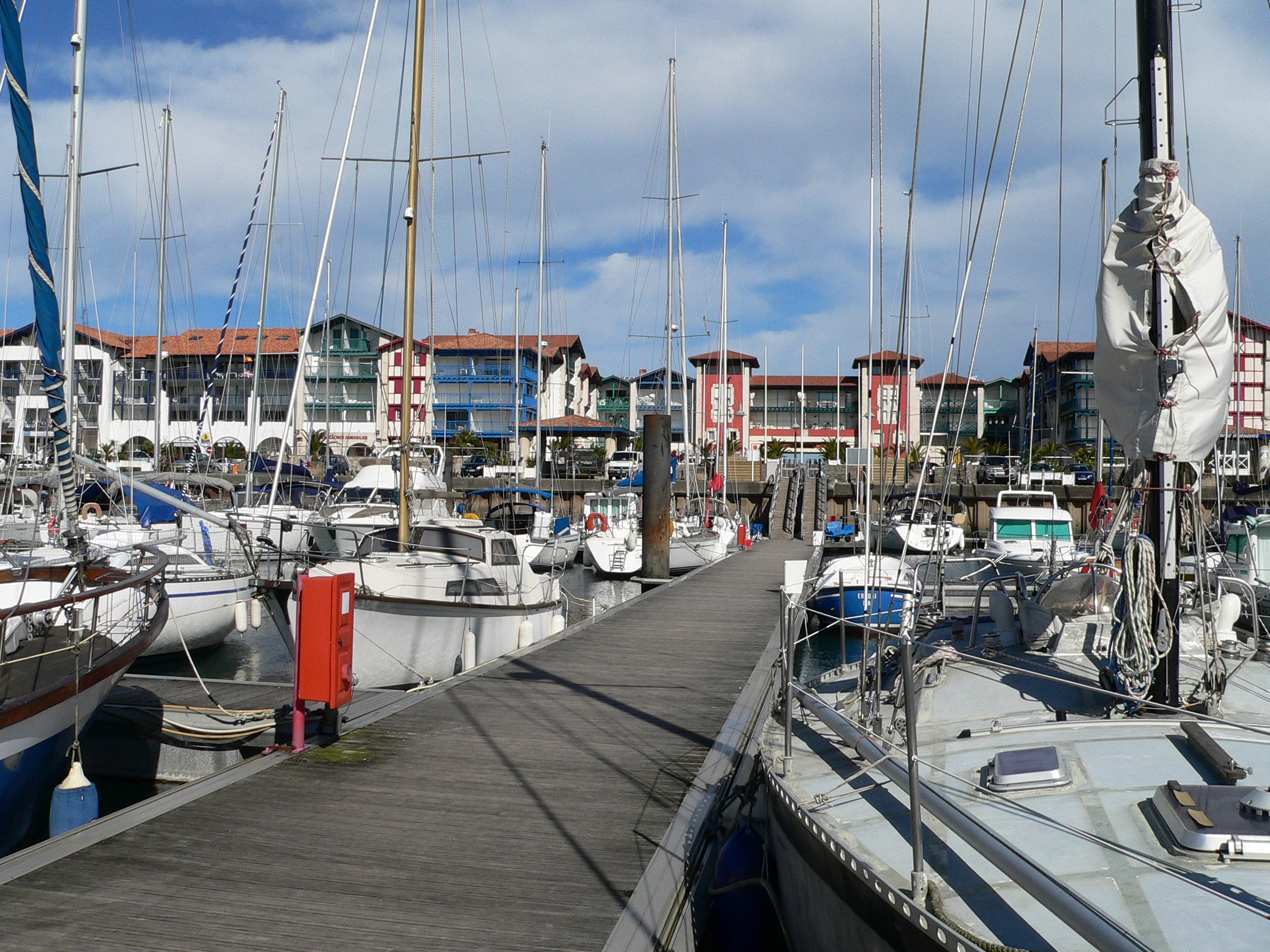
- Hendaye harbour

- Coat of arms
- Location of Hendaye
- Location within France Location within Nouvelle-Aquitaine
- Coordinates: 43°22′N 1°46′W
- Country: France
- Region: Nouvelle-Aquitaine
- Department: Pyrénées-Atlantiques
- Arrondissement: Bayonne
- Canton: Hendaye-Côte Basque-Sud
- Intercommunality: CA Pays Basque

Government
  - Mayor (2026–32): Kotte Écénarro
- Area^{1}: 8 km^{2} (3.1 sq mi)
- Elevation: 25 m (82 ft)
- Highest elevation: 108 m (354 ft)
- Lowest elevation: 0 m (0 ft)
- Population (2023): 18,102
  - Density: 2,300/km^{2} (5,900/sq mi)
- Time zone: UTC+01:00 (CET)
  - Summer (DST): UTC+02:00 (CEST)
- INSEE/Postal code: 64260 /64700
- ^{1} French Land Register data, which excludes lakes, ponds, glaciers > 1 km^{2} (0.386 sq mi or 247 acres) and river estuaries.

Hendaye (French pronunciation: [ɑ̃daj]; Basque: Hendaia, Spanish: Hendaya; Occitan: Hendaia) is a commune in the Pyrénées-Atlantiques department and Nouvelle-Aquitaine region of southwestern France.

The town, metropolitan France's most southwesterly and a popular seaside tourist resort, stands on the right bank of the River Bidasoa – which marks the Franco-Spanish border – at the point where it empties into the Atlantic Ocean in the French Basque Country.

Hendaye has three distinguishable parts: la ville (the town), which stretches from Saint Vincent's church to the area around the SNCF railway station and the industrial zone; la plage (the beach), the seaside quarter; and les hauteurs (the heights), the villas and camping sites on the hills between and behind the other two areas.

== Etymology ==
Hendaia (endai-a) means 'the baker’s peel (an oven shovel)' in the Basque language.

== History ==
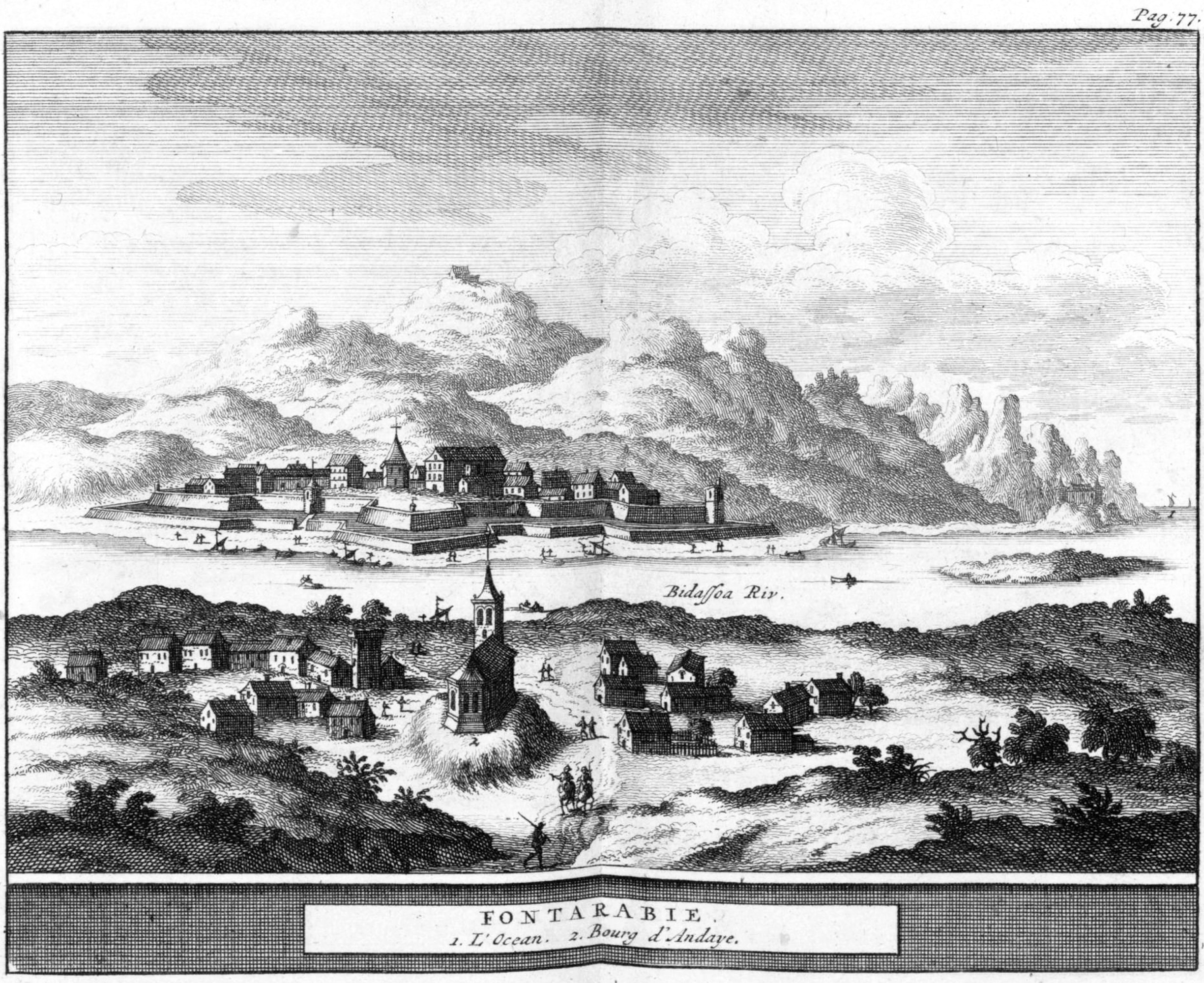
18th century depiction of the Bay of Txingudi, below Hendaye, and above Hondarribia (in Spain)

Hendaye acquired its independence from the Urrugne parish in 1598, when Saint Vincent's church was built. In the Franco-Spanish War, the town was briefly occupied by the Spanish, in September 1636.

On the fortified Île des Faisans (Pheasant Island) in the river, the Treaty of the Pyrenees was signed in 1659, ending decades of intermittent war between France and Spain. Authority over the island alternates between France and Spain every six months.

All the same, the village kept being subject to destruction due to cross-border military activity. In the War of the Pyrenees (1793–1795), the village was levelled to the ground, as described in 1799 by Wilhelm von Humboldt: "The settlement spreads over a rather wide area, and seems to have looked clean and pleasant time ago. Currently all the houses, but for a handful of them, lie destroyed. The empty walls can barely stand, while the ground before inhabited is covered with overgrown bush and hawthorn. Ivy creeps up the walls, out of crumbling windows the desolate ocean can be seen through the room. Shells can still be come across the street here and there, but hardly ever can one bump into a person. Most of the inhabitants either perished in the danger and helplessness of the runaway, or they scattered away to other places."

The abolition of the French provinces, the War of the Pyrenees and the end of Basque home rule in the Spanish Basque districts—customs on the Ebro river moved to the Pyrenees (1841)—broke definitely the fluent cross-border trade and natural coexistence of the Basque speaking communities around the lower Bidasoa and the Bay of Txingudi, divided as of then by a restricted Spanish-French border.

On 22 October 1863, the railway arrived in Hendaye, as the track on the Spanish side also approached the Bidasoa borderline. On 15 August 1864, the first Madrid-Paris train arrived in Hendaye, forever re-shaping the human and urban landscape of the village and prompting rapid development. Hendaye started to stand out as an international hub and a seaside resort for the elites after the model of Biarritz (1854), halfway between San Sebastián and Biarritz. In 1913, the Spanish Basque railway serving the coastline all the way to San Sebastián (later known as "topo", the 'mole') arrived at Hendaye Gare.

On 23 October 1940, Ramón Serrano Súñer, Francisco Franco, Adolf Hitler and Joachim von Ribbentrop met in the Hendaye railway station (then in German-occupied France) to discuss Spain's participation in World War II as part of the Axis. Franco declined Hitler's entreaties and outlived the other fascists by avoiding war with the United Kingdom.

Hendaye was the birthplace of Martin Guerre, a French peasant of the 16th century who was at the centre of a famous case of imposture.

== Population ==
Historical population
Year	Pop.	±% p.a.
1968	8,006	—
1975	9,470	+2.43%
1982	10,572	+1.59%
1990	11,578	+1.14%
1999	12,596	+0.94%
2007	13,969	+1.30%
2012	16,759	+3.71%
2017	16,484	−0.33%
2023	18,102	+1.57%
Source: INSEE

== Sights ==
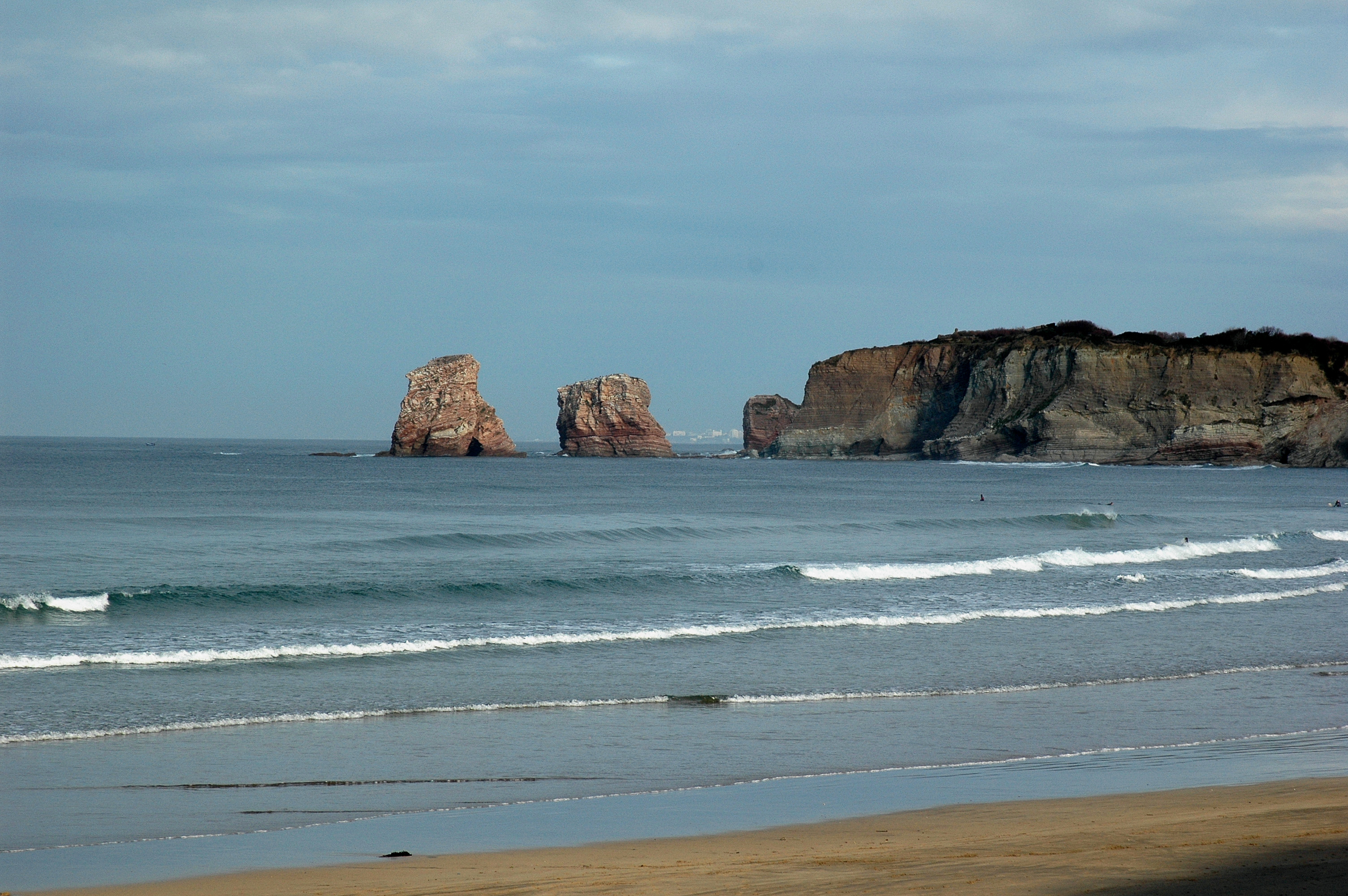
Les Jumeaux

The town square, where there is a weekly open-air market on Wednesdays, is the location of the famous seventeenth century "Great Cross of Hendaye", a stone cross carved with alchemical symbols that occultists find to contain encrypted information on a future global catastrophe. The church of Saint-Vincent was built in 1598, and largely reconstructed over the centuries following fires and bombardments. Its most recent transformation was finished in 1968. The 13th-century crucifix is the principal treasure.

The ruins of the early seventeenth century fortifications, which were reinforced by Vauban in 1685, and the old cannons facing Hondarribia, are one of the features of the promenade along the Bay of Txingudi waterfront.

The seafront Château of Antoine d'Abbadie, built by the architect and theorist Eugène Viollet-le-Duc is a monument of the Gothic Revival.

The Casino building, of Neo-Moorish style, was built in 1885. It used to be occupied by a casino (hence the name), until it was moved to the quartier de Sokoburu. During the First World War, it served as a military hospital for French soldiers and then as the Portuguese Military Hospital of Hendaia, from 15 June 1918 to 23 February 1919.

The picturesque old fishing port of Caneta has views over the Bay of Txingudi to Hondarribia and the Jaizkibel, and is also the site of Pierre Loti's house and the old customs building.

The Jumeaux rocks (Dunbarriak in Basque, literally 'the bell stones') have become somewhat emblematic to Hendaye. These two high rock stacks, which have been carved out of the cliffs by wave action, are visible from the beach or from the domaine d'Abbadia, a nature park on the edge of the commune related to the Conservatoire du littoral project.

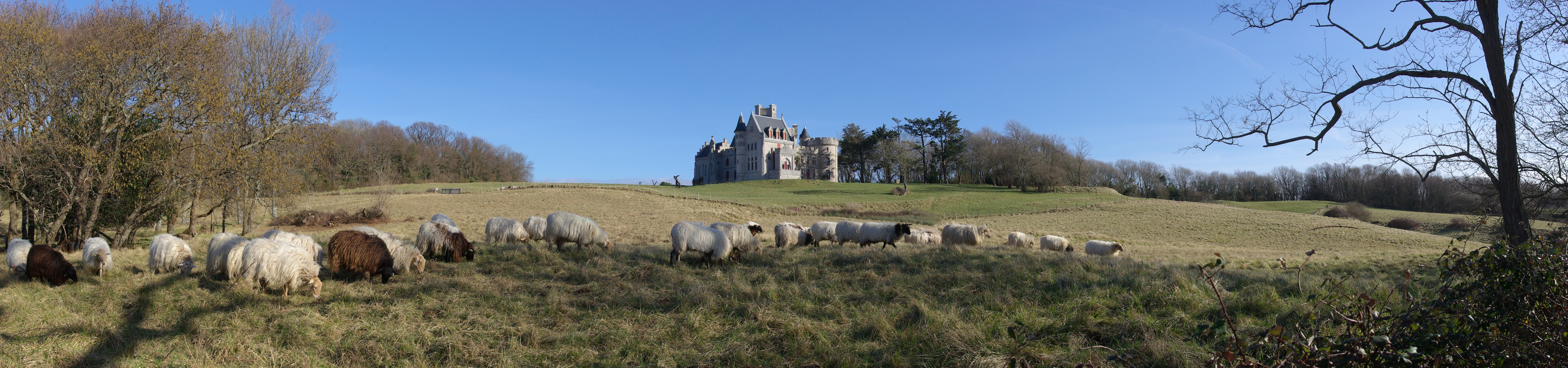
The Abbadia domain : the castle seen from the surroundings meadows

== Culture ==
=== Music ===
Hendaye has no specific music venues, but there are many places where bands can play. The covered pelota fronton at Belcenia has a high capacity and the basque folk band Oskorri have played here on more than one occasion. In summer, bigger bands can play in open air at the Hendaye Plage Rugby pitch. Toure Kunda, among others, have played here. Concerts can be organised in the Cinéma les Variétés, which also has a high capacity.

=== Theatre and performance ===
The Cinéma les Variétés is a large classic theatre and cinema, which is a regular venue for theatre, dancing, and performance arts. There is also a cinema at Sokoburu, near the quartier de la Plage, called the Salle Antoine d'Abbadie, but it is only used on special occasions.

The Théâtre des Chimères, from Biarritz, regularly perform at Hendaye.

=== Art and literature ===
The Médiathèque municipale François Mitterrand is a public library offering books, magazines, films, and CDs. There is also an art gallery, which is the main one for Hendaye.

=== Events ===
These a few of the regular festivals in Hendaye:

January

- Bixintxo (St Vincent)

May

- Mai du théâtre (theatre festival throughout the month)

June

- Fête du cidre (cider festival)
- Fête de la musique (music festival)

July

- Fête de la Mer (festival of the Sea)

August

- Fête Basque (basque festival)

=== Gastronomy ===
Most of the town's restaurants are found in the quartier de la Plage and along the Bay of Txingudi waterfront.

Hendaye is locally well known for the quality of its txurros.

== Transport ==
The town is an important railway junction, as Spain's mainline trains use a broader gauge than continental Europe, with the French railway network finishing here on the banks of the Bidasoa. As well as the Gare d'Hendaye, there is also a station serving the beach quarter (Hendaye Plage) prior to the terminus, called the Gare des Deux-Jumeaux. Basque rapid transit system San Sebastián Metro linking the town to San Sebastián gets right to Hendaye, by the SNCF station.

There has been recent controversy concerning the new LGV Sud Europe Atlantique (TGV line), which is planned to pass inland of Hendaye without stopping in or anywhere near the town itself. Most of the local population, along with that of the rest of the Côte Basque, are in favour of the TGV, but against the new line, which would destroy the surrounding countryside, bypassing the town completely. It has therefore been suggested to upgrade the present line to make it suitable for the TGV, with a stop at Hendaye station. It is argued that this would also be much less expensive, and would stimulate the local economy.

The nearest airport is San Sebastián Airport, located 6 km (3.7 mi) which is about 12 minutes drive west of Hendaye. However, the airport only provides domestic routes to other parts of Spain. If residents want to fly to other domestic destinations in France, they would need to fly from Biarritz Airport, which is located 30 km (19 mi) which is half an hour drive north east of the town.

== Agglomeration ==
Hendaye is part of the urban unit of Bayonne and of the communauté d'agglomération du Pays Basque. The functional area of Hendaye includes two more communes: Biriatou to the south and Urrugne to the east.

== Twin towns – sister cities ==
Hendaye is twinned with:

- Arguedas, Spain
- Peebles, United Kingdom
- Viana do Castelo, Portugal

== Notable people ==
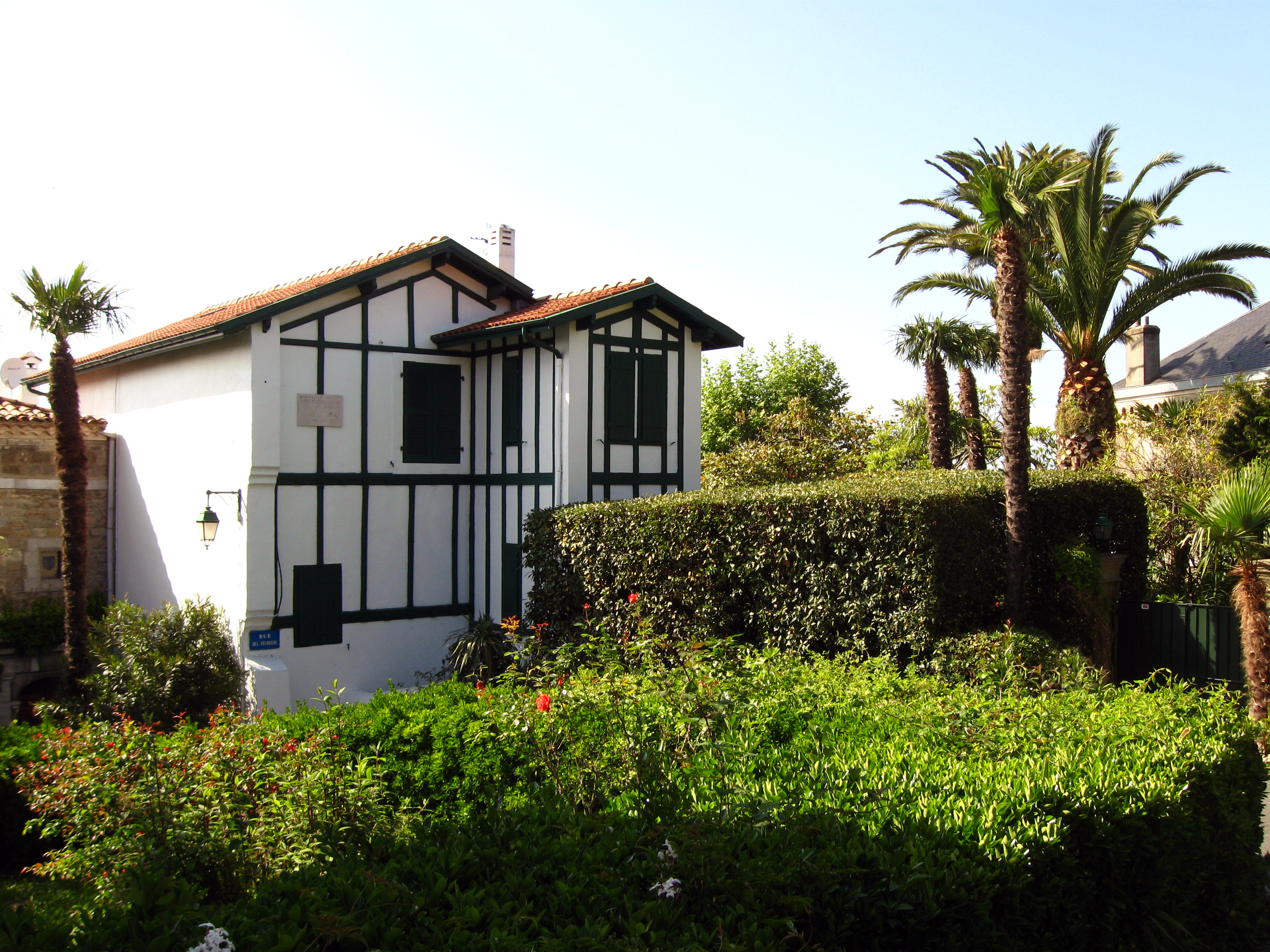
House of Pierre Loti, rue des Pêcheurs.

- Antoine d'Abbadie lived here.
- Pauline Ado, world champion surfer was born here
- Robert Basauri, a rugby player who has been selected for the French national team, was born in Hendaye and played with the Stade Hendayais.
- Coqueline Courrèges, dressmaker and co-founder of the Courrèges fashion company, born in Hendaye.
- The professional rugby player Jean-Michel Esponda was born in Hendaye and played with the Stade Hendayais. He has been selected many times for the French national team.
- Martin Guerre was born in Hendaye.
- Ernest Hemingway, American novelist, short story writer, and journalist lived in Hendaye during the late 1920s between travels to Spain, wrote, and exchanged correspondence with family and friends. Reference: https://www.nytimes.com/books/99/07/04/specials/hemingway-lettersexcerpts.html.
- Maurice Jouvet, a French-Argentine actor, was born here.
- René Labat (1892–1970), high jumper, was born in Hendaye.
- Joachim Labrouche was born in Hendaye.
- Bixente Lizarazu grew up here and played with the Eglantins.
- Pierre Loti lived and died here (1894–1923). His house, Bakharetchea ('La maison solitaire'), still exists.
- Eduardo Ortega y Gasset, a Spanish philosopher lived there since before Unamuno's arrival.
- Etienne Pellot was born and died here.
- Miguel de Unamuno, a Spanish essayist leaves Paris and moves to Hendaye in 1925.

== Sports ==
- It is the western end of the GR 10 long-distance footpath.
- It marks the beginning (or end) of the Raid Pyreneen long-distance cycle challenge.
- The Endaika rowing club was founded in 1889 and won three silver medals in the French championships in 2006 and 2007, and a coastal world championship gold medal in 2014.
- Hendaye has a Rugby and handball club, the Stade Hendayais, which was founded in 1908.
- It has a football club, the Eglantins.
- It has a surf club, the Bidasoa Surf Club.
- Hendaye is a popular surfing destination renowned for its soft beach break waves suitable for beginners.
- Since 2004, the world conception center for the watersports brand Tribord is located in Hendaye.
- Hendaye is renowned for its marina, which has 850 places, making it the third largest in Aquitaine.
- Tennis players gather for the Summer tennis tournament.

== See also ==
- Pheasant Island
- Communes of the Pyrénées-Atlantiques department
