= Hondarribia =

- Municipality
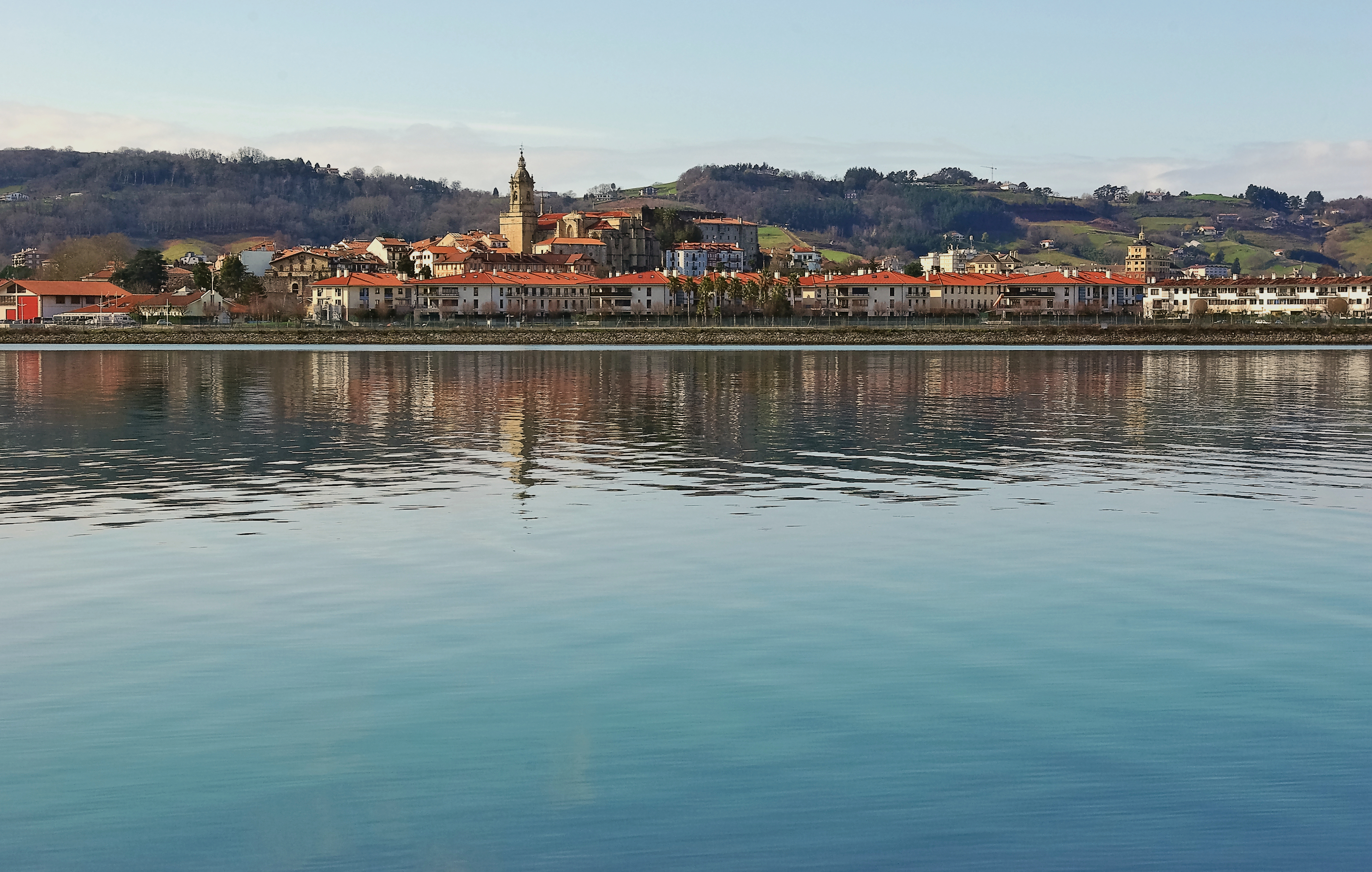
- Hondarribia as seen from Hendaye

- Flag Coat of arms

- Location of Hondarribia within the Basque Country Hondarribia (Spain)
- Coordinates: 43°22′00″N 1°47′45″W
- Country: Spain
- Autonomous community: Basque Country
- Province: Gipuzkoa
- Eskualdea: Bidasoaldea
- Founded: April 18, 1203

Government
  - Mayor: Txomin Sagarzazu (EAJ-PNV)

Area
  - Total: 28.63 km^{2} (11.05 sq mi)
- Elevation: 16 m (52 ft)
- Highest elevation: 543 m (1,781 ft)
- Lowest elevation: 0 m (0 ft)

Population (2025-01-01)
  - Total: 16,788
  - Density: 586.4/km^{2} (1,519/sq mi)
- Demonym(s): Basque: hondarribiar Spanish: fuenterribense
- Time zone: UTC+1 (CET)
  - Summer (DST): UTC+2 (CEST)
- Postal code: 20280
- Official language(s): Basque, Spanish
- Website: Official website

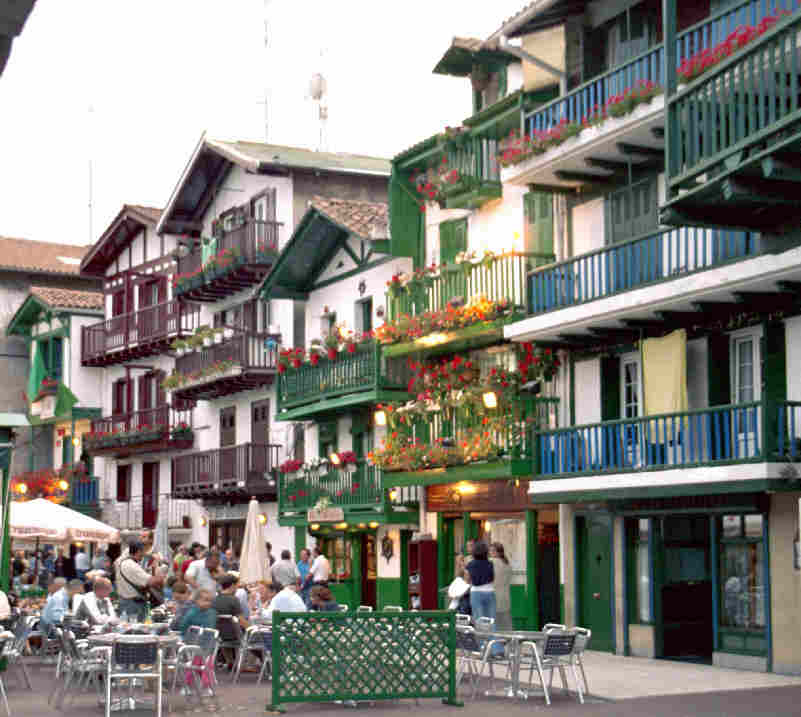
Hondarribia's fishermen's quarter

Hondarribia (Basque: Hondarribia; Spanish: Fuenterrabía; French: Fontarrabie) is a Spanish town situated on the west shore of the Bidasoa river's estuary, in Gipuzkoa, in the Basque Autonomous Community.

The border town is situated on a little promontory facing Hendaye (France) over the Txingudi bay. A service boat makes the trip between the two. The town has an ancient old quarter with walls and a castle. In addition, Hondarribia features a beach across the Bidasoa from the touristy housing estate Sokoburu in Hendaye, alongside a mountain called Jaizkibel providing a hilly backdrop to the town. A road leads northeast from the beach area to Cape Higuer, located in this municipality.

The town harbours the San Sebastian Airport, which serves domestic flights. The population as of 2005 is 15,700 inhabitants.

== Battles ==
The battles fought for possession of this fortified stronghold are generally known by the Spanish name for the place (Fuenterrabía).

- Unsuccessful attempts to seize Hondarribia were made by French troops in 1476 and 1503.
- Battle of Fuenterrabía (1521), in which Claude, Duke of Guise distinguished himself, was instigated by Guillaume Gouffier, seigneur de Bonnivet, in command of the army of Navarre; he occupied the stronghold after the renewal of hostilities. The city was finally reoccupied by Charles V's forces in 1524 after the first Siege of Fuenterrabía.
- Siege of Fuenterrabía (1638) was the outcome of a siege by the invading forces of Louis XIII, led by Condé. 27,000 French soldiers besieged the city for two months, firing 16,000 shells into the walled city, leaving only 300 survivors, most of them women and children. The city was virtually destroyed, but nevertheless did not surrender. The Spanish soldiers were successful, and the raising of the siege is celebrated annually on 8 September in a parade, known as Alarde.
- Battle of Fuenterrabía (1719), during the War of the Quadruple Alliance, part of the campaign leading to the French Siege of San Sebastian
- Battle of Fuenterrabía (1794), in which the French Revolutionary Army took the city by breaching the walls. After they took over the city, they blew up with the help of German engineers the section of wall facing France. The signing of the Peace of Basel took place before all the wall was destroyed.

Although the rout of Charlemagne in 778 is sometimes associated with Fontarabia (for example by Milton in Paradise Lost and by Scott in Marmion), it is generally understood to have taken place at Roncesvalles.

== Sports ==
The women's basketball team Hondarribia-Irun and the rowing club Hondarribia Arraun Elkartea are the two most prestigious sports clubs in the town. In the last decade, the judo club Ama Guadalupekoa has had a lot of national medals in this discipline.

The Hondarribia-Irun plays in the Spanish women's basketball league since 2003, and it has competed against European teams several times. Hondarribia has a rowing team called Hondarribia Arraun Elkartea, and its boat is characterized by its green color and its name, "Ama Guadalupekoa". In 2005 it won La Bandera de la Concha, one of the most prestigious competitions for Basque rowers.

Furthermore, the Vilariño family, which is fully linked to the world of the engine, continues to achieve success at national and European levels.

Hondarribia has its own golf course where Jose Maria Olazabal, one of the best golf players in the world, was raised, and marina, where the Olympic medalist Iker Martinez took his first boat roads.

== Leisure ==
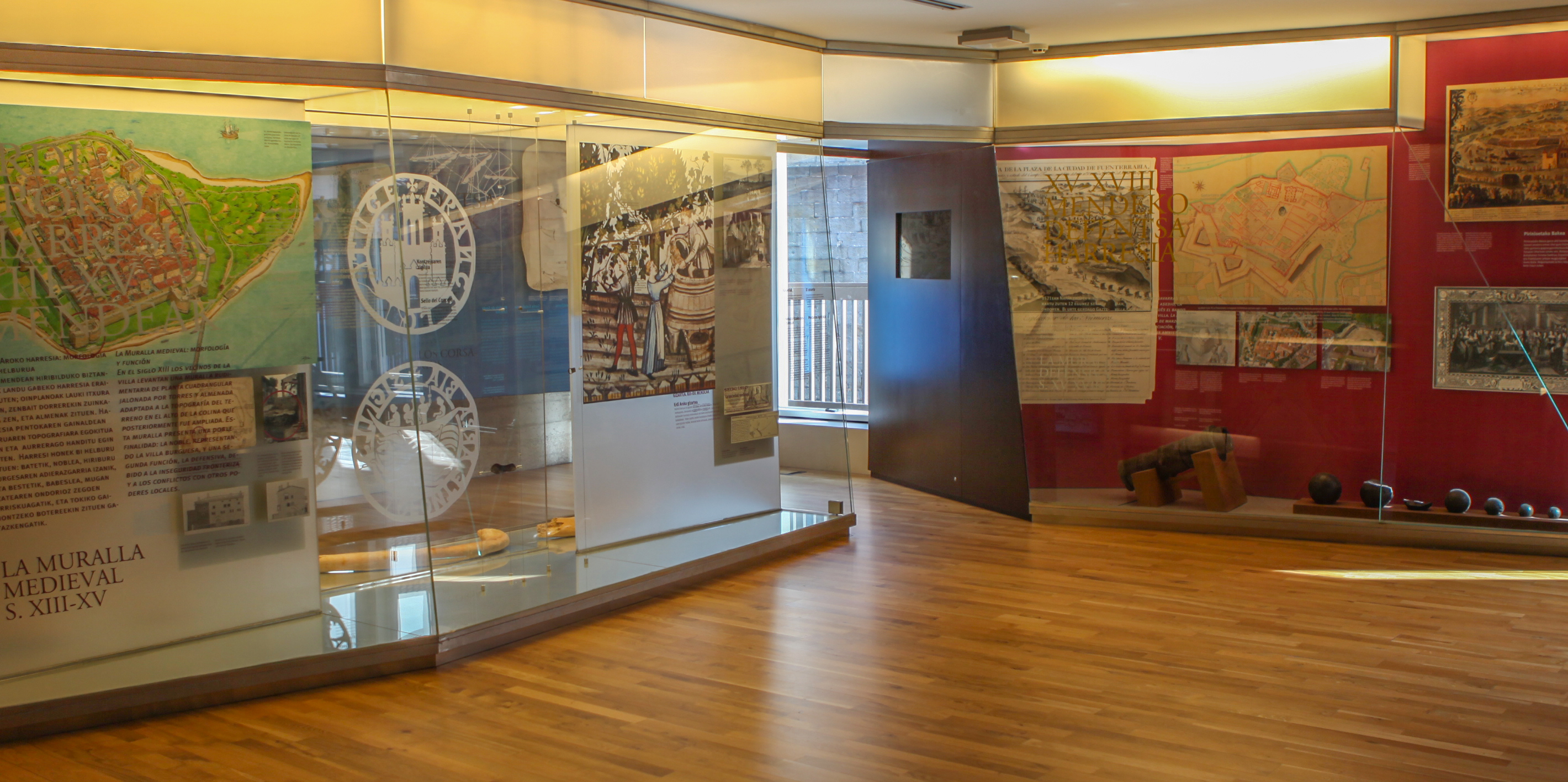
Center of interpretation of the walls of Hondarribia (Arma Plaza Fundazioa).

- The construction of a jetty and other ancillary works by the engineer Iribarren, created the beach (hondartza) of Hondarribia that provides a place to enjoy the waters of the bay. In the late twentieth century the beach was partially modified, building on its surroundings a recreational port and a sports center.
- Throughout the year, but especially in the summer months, Arma Plaza Fundazioa (municipal foundation) organizes guided visits to the old town, the port-quarter of the Marina and the Fort of Guadalupe.
- The tourist office also managed by Arma Plaza Fundazioa, located in the Plaza de Armas, incorporates an interpretation center with spaces for audiovisual presentations / temporary exhibitions and souvenirs of the city.

== Notable people ==
- Juan de Alcega (16th century), mathematician and tailor known by his book on geometrical tailoring.
- Jorge Bolet, legendary American-Cuban pianist
- José María Olazábal famous Spanish golfer, winner of two U.S. Masters titles and regular member of the European Ryder Cup team.
- Unai Emery, manager of Aston Villa, winner of Europa League and the former manager of Villareal, Arsenal, Paris Saint Germain, Sevilla FC, Valencia CF and Spartak Moscow.
- Íñigo Cervantes, professional tennis player
- Itziar Mendizabal, ballet dancer
- Ander Vilariño, racing driver

== Gallery ==
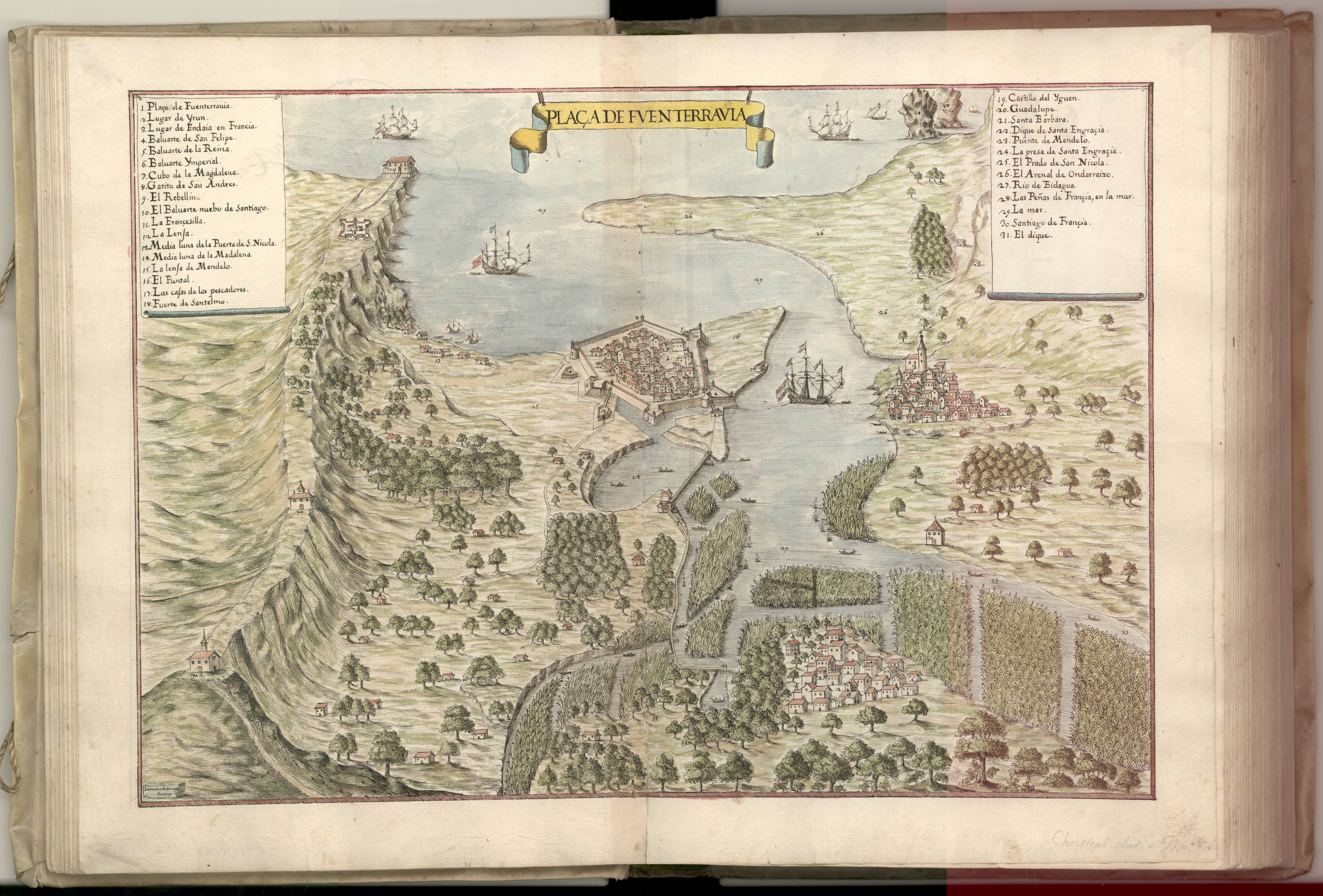
Hand-drawn map of Hondarribia from 1699 by Leonardus de Ferrarys.

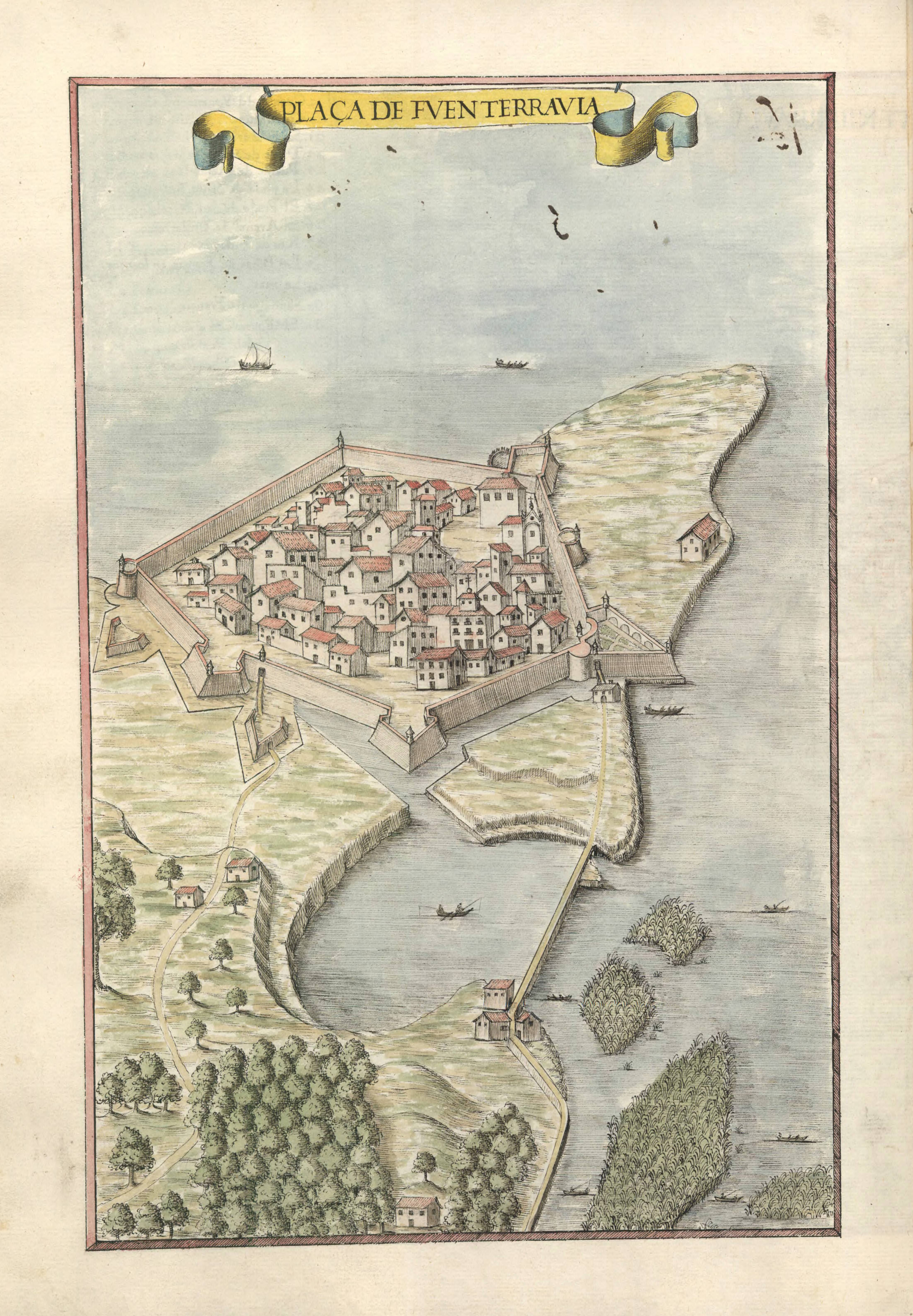
Hand-drawn map of Hondarribia from 1699 by Leonardus de Ferrarys.

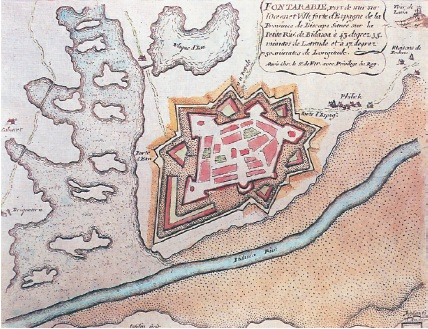
Medieval map of Hondarribia.

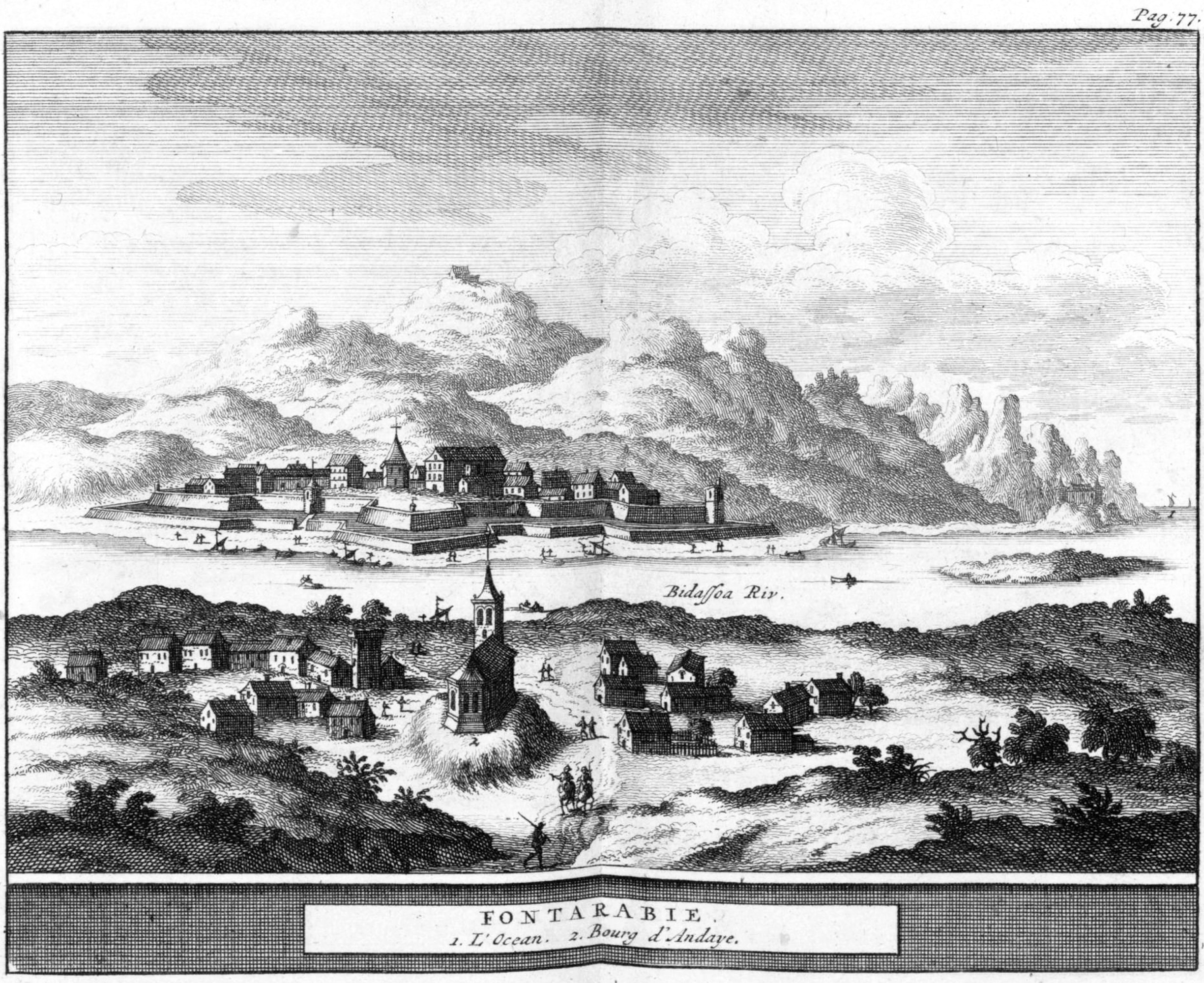
Above Hondarribia with its City Walls, and below French Hendaye town in 1640

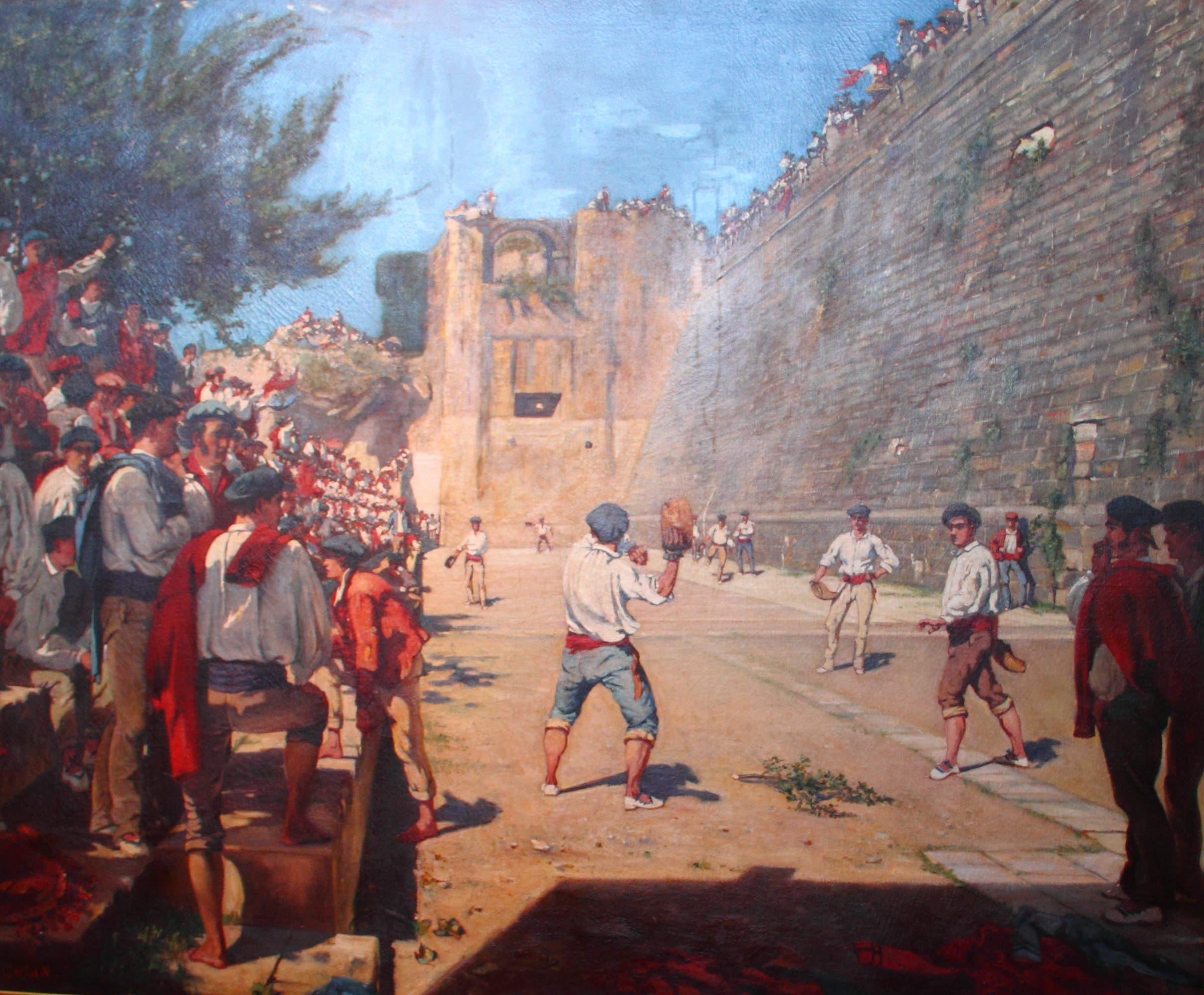
Basque Pelota's game under the Hondarribia's City Walls, by Gustave Colin in 1863

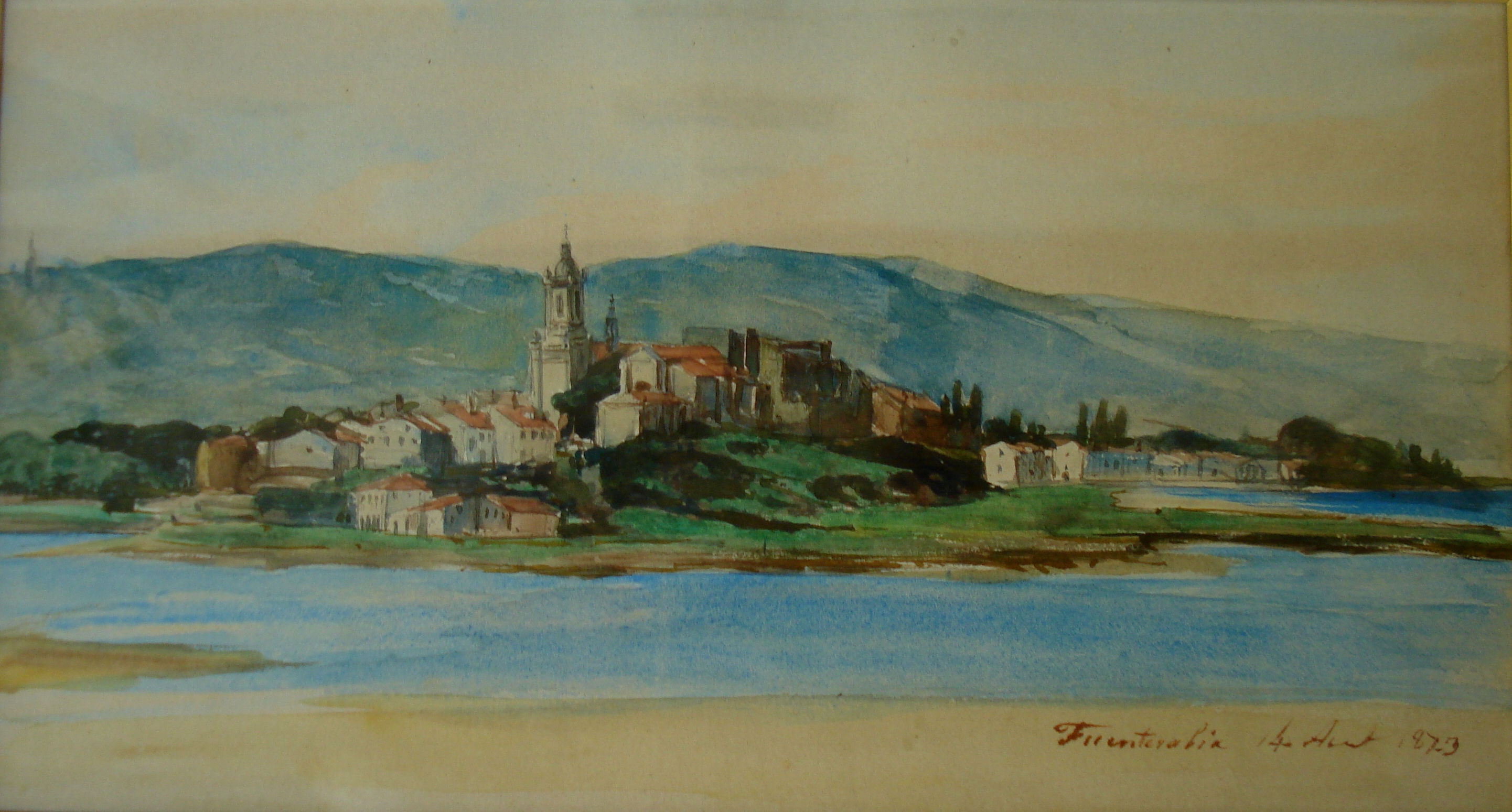
Hondarribia by Armand-Dumaresq in 1873

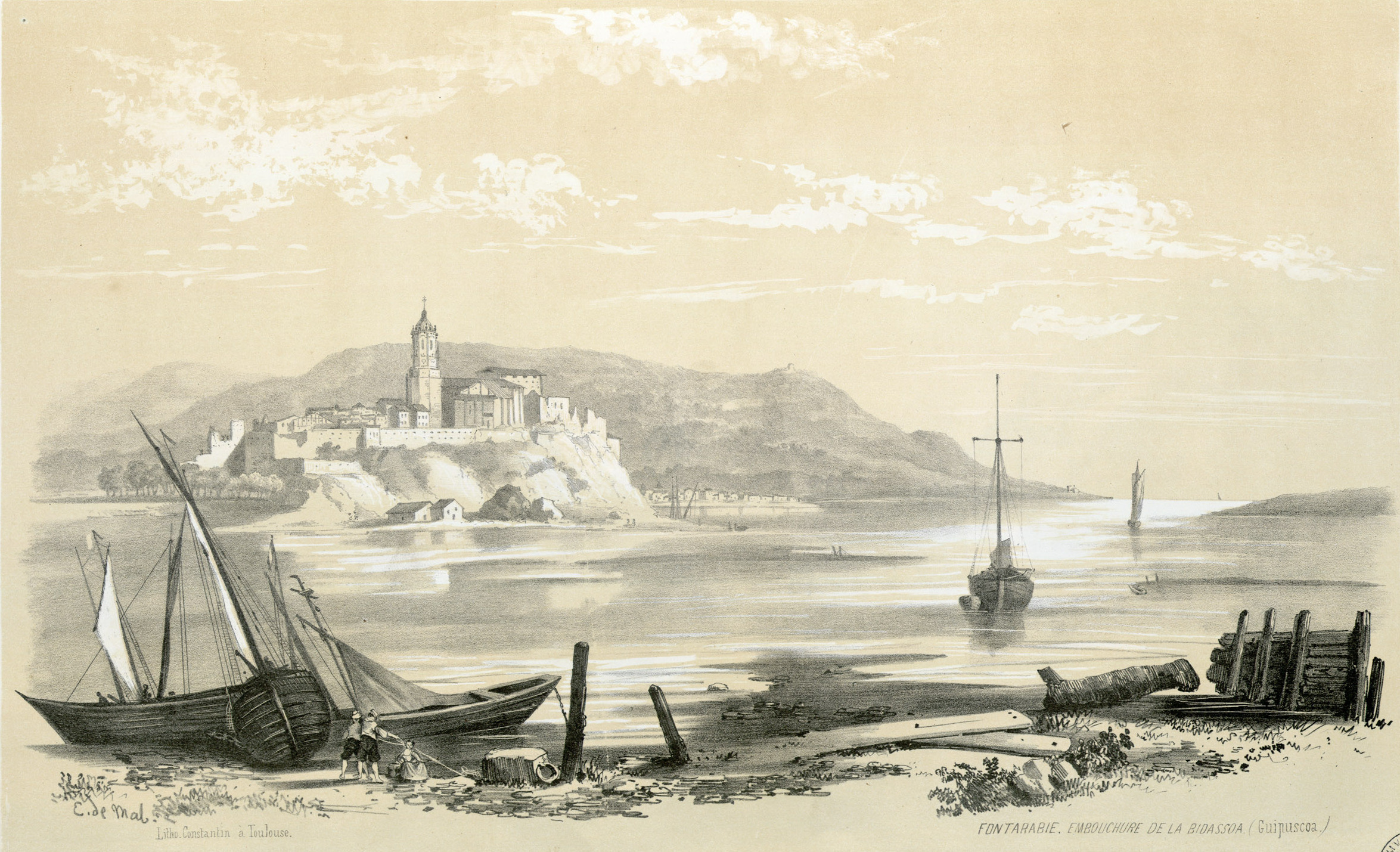
Bidassoa confluence in Fontarrabie, in 1843 by Eugène de Malbos

== Climate ==
Climate data for San Sebastián Airport, Hondarribia (1981–2010 normals)
Month	Jan	Feb	Mar	Apr	May	Jun	Jul	Aug	Sep	Oct	Nov	Dec	Year
Record high °C (°F)	24.6 (76.3)	28.6 (83.5)	29.0 (84.2)	32.4 (90.3)	36.6 (97.9)	39.8 (103.6)	40.4 (104.7)	40.0 (104.0)	38.0 (100.4)	33.4 (92.1)	29.4 (84.9)	26.0 (78.8)	40.4 (104.7)
Mean daily maximum °C (°F)	13.1 (55.6)	13.8 (56.8)	16.1 (61.0)	17.5 (63.5)	20.7 (69.3)	23.1 (73.6)	25.1 (77.2)	25.7 (78.3)	24.0 (75.2)	21.0 (69.8)	16.2 (61.2)	13.5 (56.3)	19.2 (66.6)
Daily mean °C (°F)	8.9 (48.0)	9.4 (48.9)	11.6 (52.9)	13.0 (55.4)	16.2 (61.2)	19.0 (66.2)	21.0 (69.8)	21.5 (70.7)	19.4 (66.9)	16.4 (61.5)	12.0 (53.6)	9.6 (49.3)	14.8 (58.6)
Mean daily minimum °C (°F)	4.7 (40.5)	5.0 (41.0)	7.0 (44.6)	8.5 (47.3)	11.8 (53.2)	14.8 (58.6)	16.9 (62.4)	17.2 (63.0)	14.7 (58.5)	11.8 (53.2)	7.8 (46.0)	5.6 (42.1)	10.5 (50.9)
Record low °C (°F)	−12.0 (10.4)	−13.0 (8.6)	−5.2 (22.6)	−1.2 (29.8)	3.0 (37.4)	5.3 (41.5)	7.8 (46.0)	8.4 (47.1)	4.6 (40.3)	0.8 (33.4)	−5.8 (21.6)	−8.4 (16.9)	−13.0 (8.6)
Average precipitation mm (inches)	157 (6.2)	135 (5.3)	124 (4.9)	156 (6.1)	120 (4.7)	95 (3.7)	85 (3.3)	117 (4.6)	132 (5.2)	167 (6.6)	188 (7.4)	174 (6.9)	1,649 (64.9)
Average precipitation days (≥ 1 mm)	13	12	12	14	12	10	9	10	10	12	13	12	138
Average snowy days	1	1	0	0	0	0	0	0	0	0	0	0	2
Average relative humidity (%)	75	72	70	71	72	73	74	75	75	75	76	75	74
Mean monthly sunshine hours	88	108	141	159	182	188	198	197	170	134	96	81	1,750
Source: Agencia Estatal de Meteorología
