= Línea P =

Spanish line of defense along the Spanish/French border

Line P
- Línea P
- Spanish/French border in the Pyrenees in Spain
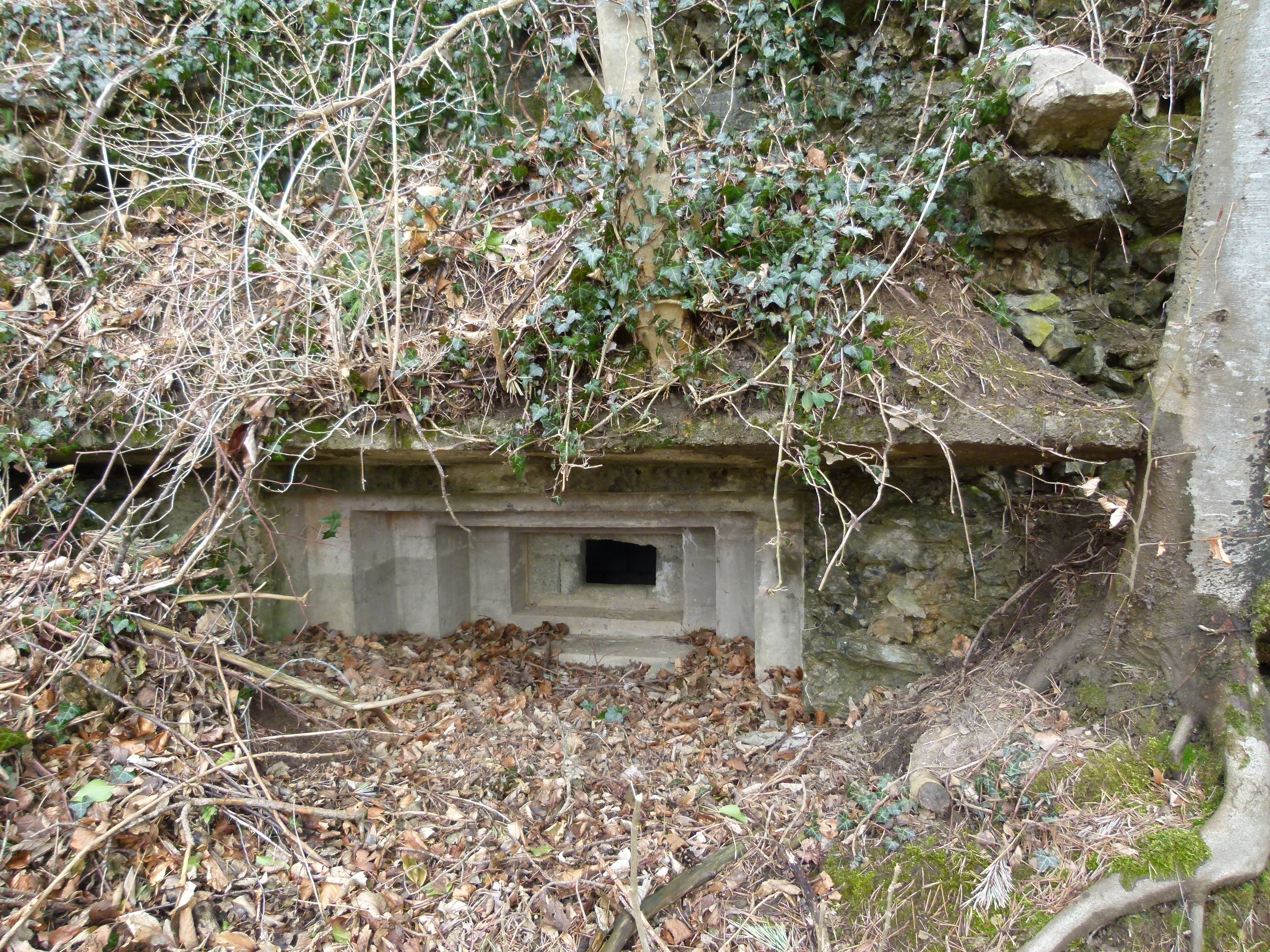
- Bunker, part of the Center of Resistance N.R. 36, in the eastern part of the Línea P (Cataluña)

Site information
- Type: Defensive line
- Owner: Spanish army
- Open to the public: Only some sites
- Condition: Abandoned

Location
- Coordinates: 42°38′43.65″N 0°46′14.38″E
- Length: about 500 km (310 miles)

Site history
- Built: 1944-1948
- Built by: Spanish army (conscripts and forced labor)
- In use: never (last inspection in 1986)
- Materials: Reinforced concrete, steel, iron
- Events: Spanish Question; Spanish Maquis

The Línea P (P line), officially the Pyrenees Defense Organisation (Organización Defensiva de los Pirineos), was a fortified line of defense built in the Pyrenees between 1944 and 1948 to prevent an invasion into Spanish territory.

After the end of the Spanish Civil War, the government of General Franco decided to build a defensive line in the Pyrenees, that would go from the Mediterranean to the Cantabrian Sea, approximately 500 kilometres (310 mi) of fortified defensive points, stretching up to a depth of 60 km (37 miles) from the border. Some 8,000 – 10,000 bunkers were planned, of which approximately half were completed. Their garrison would have theoretically consisted of about 75,000 men. There is no evidence that the line was ever fully armed and operational.

The defensive points of the Línea P and its access roads were built by war prisoners and jailed political opponents of the Francoist regime grouped in Batallones de Trabajadores (Workers’ Battalions) immediately after the Spanish Civil War and from 1940 to December 1942, in Batallones Disciplinarios de Soldados Trabajadores (Disciplinary Battalions of Workers-Soldiers)

In a broader sense, Línea P also refers to the successive Pyrenean fortifications built after the Spanish Civil War that would previous fortifications (1939–1940), the counter-tank defense (1950–1954) and other fortifications, such as those at Cape Higuer in Fuenterrabía, Guipúzcoa finished in 1957.

The Línea P was definitively abandoned after the Spanish army performed its last inspection in the 1980s.

== Origin of the name ==
Military historians often refer to this line of defensive fortifications along the French border as the "P Line" or the Pyrenees Line, in analogy with the French Maginot Line or the German Siegfried Line. However, at no time does "Línea P" appear in the official Spanish military archives.

The Línea P was also known pejoratively as "Pérez Line" and, in Catalonia, as the "Gutiérrez Line". However, the origin of such denominations have not been convincingly explained so far. It was also known in Catalonia as the "García Line", named after General Rafael García Valiño who participated in the fighting against the invasion of Val d'Aran by the Spanish Maquis.

== History ==
After the end of the Spanish Civil War, hundreds of thousands of Republican soldiers and civilians crossed the French border ahead of the advancing Nationalist troops. Many Republican soldiers settled in the mountains of the Pyrenees and the Spanish Republican government in exile was formed in France. They continued to fight against Francoist Spain until the early 1960s, carrying out sabotage, robberies to help fund guerrilla activity, occupations of Spanish embassies in France and assassinations of Francoists, as well as contributing to the fight against Nazi Germany and the Vichy regime in France during World War II.

Following the Allied landing in French North Africa, Nazi Germany carried out "Operation Anton" on 11 November 1942, invading the southern zone of France for fear of a landing on the French Mediterranean coast. Beginning 1943, Nazi Germany started to build a line of fortifications in the Pyrenees, called Sperrlinie Pyrenäenfront, from Cerbere to Hendaye, along Le Perthus, Maurellàs, Las Illas, Prats-de-Mollo-la-Preste and the French Cerdagne and built coastal batteries in Le Barcarès, Torreilles, Sainte-Marie-la-Mer, Collioure et Port-Vendres which became part of the Südwall.

In August 1944, the liberation of France entered a decisive phase with the liberation of Toulouse and the south of France, giving the Spanish border a special significance. Neither General Franco nor Nazi Germany could ever manage to close the border effectively, as alternative routes to the usual ones were sought to cross it.

The exiled Republicans had high hopes that at the end of World War II in Europe, Franco would be removed from power by the victorious Allies and that they would be able to return to Spain. The Junta Espanola de Liberación (J.E.L.) in Mexico was first formed in November 1943, in an attempt to build a national committee inspired by the French Committee of National Liberation, and in Toulouse in August 1944.

The French provisional government was in a difficult situation in the autumn of 1944. While the war against Nazi Germany was continuing in the north of France, large areas of the liberated territory were not under its direct control and were in practice controlled by the Resistance and other guerrilla groups. Therefore, when Charles de Gaulle, head of the French provisional government, traveled to Toulouse on 16 September 1944 to pay tribute to the French Resistance and Spanish republican fighters that liberated Toulouse, the real objective of De Gaulle's visit was to bring Toulouse under the control of the French state. It was not in De Gaulle's best interest the Spanish republicans opened a second front in the Pyrenees and expressed his disagreement with any attempt to cross the Spanish border and return to the maquis.

The Spanish Maquis and exiled members of the Partido Comunista de Espana (PCE) started on 19 October 1944 the Invasion of Val d'Aran, known under the code name "Operation Reconquest of Spain" (Operation Reconquista of Spain). Between 4,000 and 7,000 guerrillas, well equipped and with heavy weapons, entered Spanish territory through Val d'Aran and other parts of the Pyrenees. The objective of the offensive was to retake the sector of Spanish territory comprising the land between the Cinca and Segre Rivers and the French border. The zone was later declared conquered by the Spanish Republican government in exile to provoke a general uprising against Franco throughout Spain. It was hoped that it would force the Allies to "liberate" Spain the same way it was "liberating" the rest of Europe and that it would make the Spaniards who were against the regime revolt to end General Franco's dictatorship.

The main attack in the valley was accompanied by operations in other valleys of the Pyrenees during the previous weeks to distract Franco's forces. These other attacks were intended also to evaluate the situation in the interior of Spain and make contact with other groups of exiles. The most important points of penetration in the long chain of mountains were Roncesvalles, Roncal, Hecho, Canfranc, Val d'Aran, Andorra, and Cerdanya, though there were also operations at smaller points. The offensives were repelled by a great force that was moved into the area by Franco, made up of the Civil Guard, Armed Police Corps, battalions of the Spanish Army, and 40,000 Moroccan (Army of Africa) troops. The invasion of the Val d'Aran ended on 28 October 1944 in a complete failure for the Republican side, when the last guerrillas re-crossed the border back into France, without the hoped-for uprising. These attacks forced Franco to prepare for future similar attacks by deciding to fortify the Pyrenees.

In 1945, de Gaulle had all the Spanish Republican flags in France removed and definitively disowned the Junta Española de Liberación. Spanish republicans, after France and the Allies' rejection, were forced into a guerrilla war, known as the Spanish Maquis, and the Spanish Republic government-in-exile faded away to a symbolic role.

In an attempt to isolate the Franco regime, Félix Gouin, de Gaulle's successor as head of the French provisional government, decided on 26 February 1946 to close the border with Spain on 1 March 1946. On April 18, 1946, Polish ambassador Oskar Lange, supported by the Soviet Union, France and Mexico, asked the United Nations to condemn Spain as an aggressive country based on information that Franco was accumulating troops on the French border and fortifying the Pyrenees, but nobody knew that these works had already begun in 1939 earlier in the whole mountain range. This request was rejected thanks to Sir Alexander Cadogan, the British representative to the UN. Finally, the United States government communicated the results of a survey "that the fortifications in the Pyrenees were essentially defensive". On December 12, 1946, the UN General Assembly adopted Resolution 39, which excluded the Spanish government from international organizations and conferences established by the United Nations.

However, the Cold War caused the US government to change its attitude towards Francoist Spain, considering that Spain, due to its geographical situation and anti-communist government, would be a valuable asset to the so-called "free world" plans. Under these conditions, Spain was gaining sympathy among several member countries of the UN. In January 1950, Secretary of State Dean Acheson admitted that the Resolution 39 had been a failure, mentioning that the government was able to support a resolution that would end both issues. On 4 November 1950, the UN General Assembly adopted resolution 386, repealing the recommendation that prevented Spain from being a member of the International agencies established or linked by the United Nations. This resolution paved the way for Spain to join the United Nations system, which began in 1951 with the incorporation of UN agencies such as UPU, ITU, FAO and WHO, and completed with the accession of Spain to the United Nations in 1955.

== Construction ==
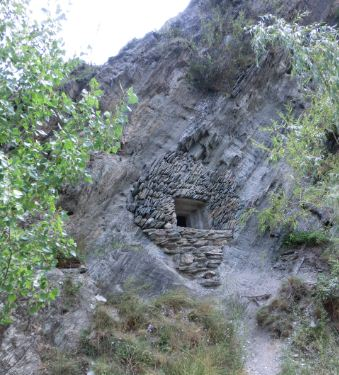
Machine gun position at C.R. 76 in La Guingueta d'Àneu.

The nationalist dictatorship of Franco thought of landscapes and mountain ranges as an integral part of the Spanish nation. The Spanish army was convinced at the end of the 1930s that fortifications in the Pyrenees could stop an army from entering through one of the mountain passes into Spain. Fortified defense lines were typical of Europe before World War II in the style of the Maginot, Siegfried, Mannerheim, Metaxás Lines.

In 1936, months before the Civil war, cavalry commander Sanjuán Cañete published a book on the Pyrenean border giving indications of possible defensive works to be done. More specifically Sanjuán Cañete carried out a detailed analysis of the network of trails and roads on the Pyrenees, adding considerations and proposals of a strategic nature. The thoroughness of this study was of great importance for the establishment of the bases of future defensive systems in the Pyrenees.

Since September 1940 there had been plans to fortify the Eastern Pyrenees (Catalonia) in the event of a possible invasion through Le Perthus with motorized troops. The plans were finalized in 1943. In August 1944, the Spanish Chief of Staff signed Instruction C-15 ordering the fortifications of the Pyrenees. The border area was to be divided into three sectors: Eastern Pyrenees (Catalonia), Central Pyrenees (Aragon) and Western Pyrenees (Navarra and Basque Country). Fortifications had not only to become part of the landscape but also to take advantage of the protection offered by nature. Defensive points were to be excavated in the rock and concealed with camouflage.

Started in the autumn of 1944, the construction of the Línea P was entrusted to the former military regions IV ( Catalonia and Valencia), V (Aragón and Soria) and VI (Navarra, País Vasco, Santander, Burgos, and Logroño) that bordered France. A large number of means and men (essentially conscript soldiers and forced labor) were mobilized for its construction.

To coordinate and carry out these building works, a center of operations was chosen within each zone to be fortified. In recent years, research has been published on the links between these works and the network of Francoist concentration camps.

Every sector was subdivided in Centers of Resistance (Nucleos de Resistencia in Spanish, N.R.), which, in turn, included a large number of defensive points with reinforced concrete bunkers. This centers of resistance were intended to cover the main lines of penetrations, inside Spanish territory, while capable of defending themselves autonomously. Spanish military strategists needed also to compensate for the defensive weaknesses of the two extremities of the Pyrenees: the Basque Country and Navarra in the west and Catalonia in the east. The fortification efforts were determined by the topography of the Pyrenees. Consequently, no less than 100 Centers of Resistance were built in Catalonia, 56 in the Basque Country and Navarra and 20 in Aragón.

Each Center of Resistance had a large number of defense points grouped in support points, and these in turn in Units and they in Sub-Units. The defense points would typically house a machine gun, an anti-tank gun, an infantry cannon, an anti-aircraft gun, an 81 mm mortar or a 50 mm mortar. Observatories were also built, as well as shelters and ammunition or food stores. The original plan was that each defense point would be surrounded by trenches with a shooter's well placed at each end. The whole complex would be surrounded by a wire fence.

The Francoist project for the 500-km fortified line across the Pyrenees consisted of some 8,000 – 10,000 defensive points of which approximately half were built, stretching up to a depth of 60 km (37 miles) from the border. Their garrison would have theoretically consist of about 75,000 men. In spite of the effort made in its construction, there is no evidence that it was ever fully operational and armed, nor the armored doors that were manufactured to close the bunkers were placed or the barbed wire fences were deployed. The wire fences and armored doors that were produced to protect these settlements remained in storage in Figueras, Pamplona, and Jaca and eventually sent to the Spanish Sahara.

Even if the works on the defensive were never finished, several military inspections took place over the years to check the settlements, as the military command considered these works to be strategic in the military defense of the national territory. The last inspection of these fortifications in the valley of the Aragón River date from 1986.

The integration of Spain into the then European Economic Community and NATO in 1986 lead to the definitive abandonment of the Pyrenean fortification line as a defensive military infrastructure, becoming, in some cases, another tourist attraction in the Pyrenees.

=== The Línea P in the Basque Country and Navarra ===
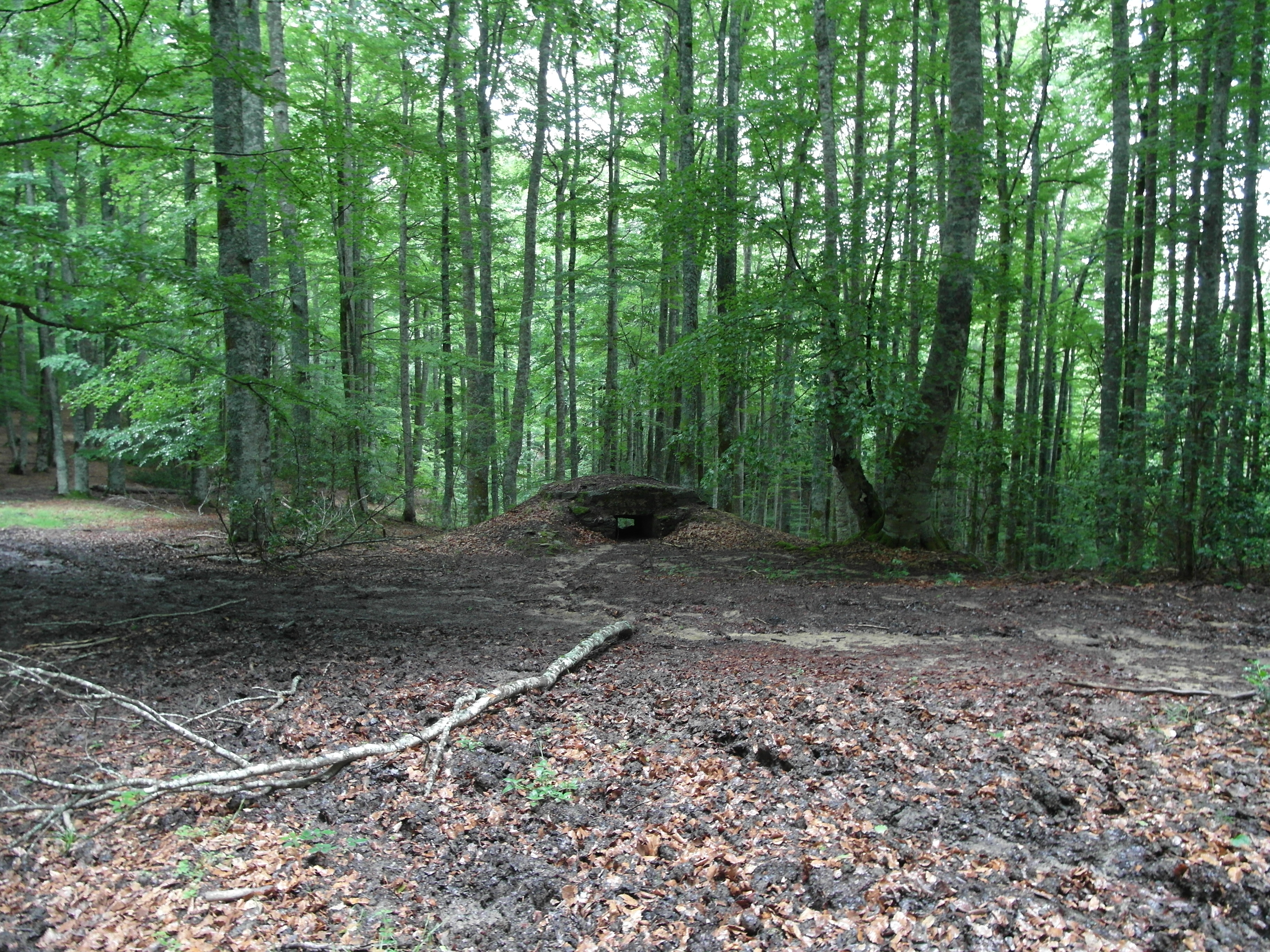
Typical machine gun emplacement in the Navarrese area of the P line, near Burguete

When the Third Carlist War ended in 1876, the Spanish military authorities came with an ambitious plan to defend the French border in the central and western Pyrenees. Around Irun, a group of defensive forts was proposed and the construction of the Campo Atrincherado de Oyarzun (Entrenched camp at Oiartzun) started. Six forts were planned to form the first line of defense around Irun and another two would form a second line of defense, which could be used to defend San Sebastián and the port of Pasajes. Economic problems and military obsolescence led to the cancellation of the project. Only the forts of San Marcos (1888), Choritoquieta/Txoritokieta (1890) and Guadalupe (1900) on the Jaizkibel mountain range were finally built.

Between June 1939 and June 1940, a remarkable group of fortifications, known as the "Vallespín Fortification", was built in the western Pyrenees, stretching from Guipúzcoa to Navarra. It was named after the colonel José Vallespín who designed them. When its construction ended in 1940, the construction of the roads around it continued. These fortifications were later partially integrated into the Línea P.

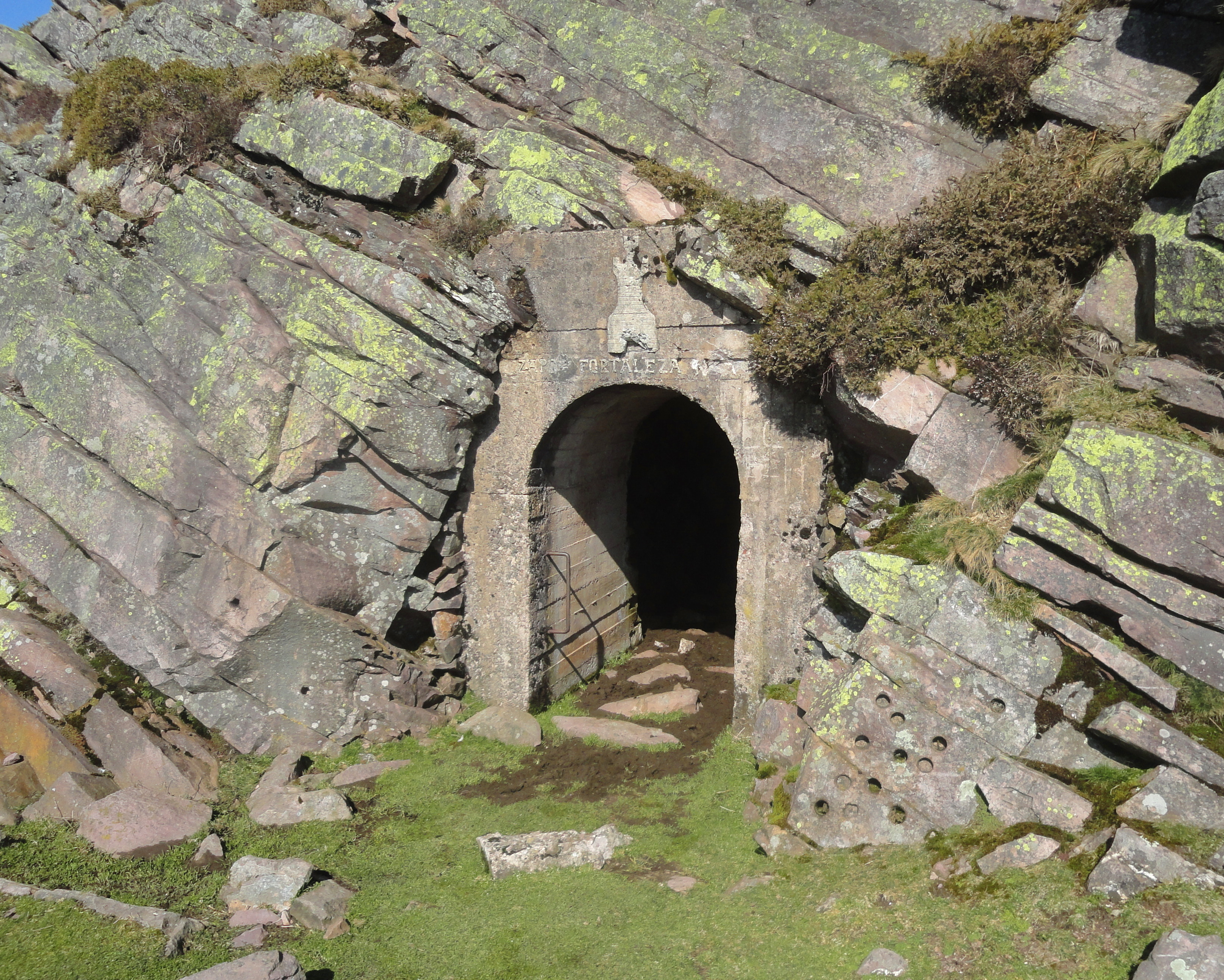
Entrance to the Alkurruntz fortress (Navarre, Spain)

In Guipúzcoa and Navarra, 2,900 defensive points were planned and 1,800 completed. The Center of Resistance N.R. 245 was built next to the fort of Guadeloupe on the Jaizkibel mountain range. With a total of 59 bunkers initially planned, 16 defensive points for machine guns and 27 for automatic weapons were completed. The valleys of the Baztan river and the Bidasoa river in Bera were also heavily fortified.

Grouped in Batallones de Trabajadores (Workers’ Battalions) and from 1940 to December 1942, in Batallones Disciplinarios de Soldados Trabajadores (Disciplinary Battalions of Workers-Soldiers), prisoners were used to building defensive points of the Línea P and its access roads. Between 1939 and 1945, over 21,000 prisoners carried out fortification and road construction works in Navarra, in Gipuzkoa, and to a lesser extent in Bizkaia, with the coastal fortifications between Getxo and Gorliz.

=== The Línea P in Aragón ===
In Aragón, the Spanish army built 20 centers of Resistance, divided into five sectors. Aragón was the region with the lowest density of Centers of Resistance, probably since in many parts, the mountains are over 2,500 meters above sea level, which makes most of the region inaccessible.

Numbered from N.R. 101 to N.R. 120, they covered the whole of the Aragónese Pyrenees from the valley of Zuriza to the border with Lérida. In the Alto Gállego they were called from north to south: N.R. 110 "El Furco", N.R. 109 "Sallent", N.R. 108 "Las Grampas", N.R. 107 "Panticosa", N.R. 106 "Hoz" and N.R. 120 "Biescas". Centers of Resistance could house more than fifty defensive works, depending on their importance.

In the Valley of the Aragón River, the Canfranc railway station was chosen for the center of operations because of its central location. This was the place where the carpentry work was carried out and the construction material stored. At the same time, it served as a place to lodge the soldiers who worked there. From this point, everything was taken to the construction sites. In many cases part of the transport was done by mules, arriving in up to six hours to the destination, such as the Center of Resistance N.R. 114 in La Raca, Canfranc.

=== The Línea P in Catalonia ===
The region of Cerdanya was considered of high strategic value and therefore concentrated a large number of defensive points and bunkers built to stop an intrusion at one of the most important penetration routes through the Pyrenees. Every twelve or sixteen kilometers of border, four centers of resistance were built to allow an effective defense against a possible frontal attack but have also thought to protect against flank attacks.

In the municipality of Garriguella (Alt Empordà) alone, more than 380 bunkers (13% of the Línea P in Catalonia) were built.

== Preservation and restoration ==
The very nature of the project has led to almost 80% of the military archives being classified as restricted, confidential or secret. Their accessibility is therefore subject to the provisions of the Spanish Historical Heritage Law and the Military Archives Regulations of 1998 and the Spanish Law on Official Secrets. As a consequence, the Francoist fortification of the Pyrenees began only to attract the attention of scholars in the mid of 1990s.

After years left unattended, different restoration works were started in various sections of the line during the mid-2000s. In 2007, the Park of bunkers of Montellà i Martinet was the first initiative to present a center of resistance (N.R. 52) to the general public and the period in which they were built. In Canfranc, the center of resistance N.R. 111 "Arañones" (sector 24) was restored in 2008. N.R. 111 was made up of 13 fortified defensive points located in the southern area of the Paseo de los Melancólicos in Canfranc. Its objective was to defend the Canfranc International railway station and the southern access tunnel to Spain. The largest bunkers are fitted out as shelters for pilgrims and mountaineers.

On September 12, 2010, a marked outdoor itinerary was inaugurated in La Guingueta d'Àneu, consisting of a walk in the valley of the Noguera Pallaresa river, on the shore of the reservoir of La Torrassa, to visit four bunkers belonging to the center of resistance N.R. 76. On 8 January 2011, the "Route of the Bunkers" was inaugurated in the municipality of Biescas (Huesca). The route starts from the low battery of the fort of Santa Elena and some settlements belonging to the Center of Resistance 106 (Hoz de Jaca) can be visited.

== See also ==
- Bilbao's Iron Ring
- XYZ Line
