= List of Sites of Community Importance in the Basque Country =

This is a list of Sites of Community Importance in the Basque Autonomous Community.

| ID | Name | Coordinates | Image |
|---|---|---|---|
| ES2110003 | Urkabustaizko irla-hariztiak / Robledales isla de Urkabustaiz (official name: Urkabustaizko irla-hariztiak / Robledales isla de Urkabustaiz); Other names: n/a | 42.9422°N 2.8794°W | Looks like this Site of Community Interest has an image. Don't worry, you can take one of your own, and upload it too! |
| ES2110004 | Arkamu-Gibillo-Arrastaria (official name: Arkamu-Gibillo-Arrastaria); Other names: n/a | 42.9068°N 2.9733°W | Looks like this Site of Community Interest has an image. Don't worry, you can take one of your own, and upload it too! |
| ES2110005 | Omecillo-Tumecillo ibaia / Río Omecillo-Tumecillo (official name: Omecillo-Tumecillo ibaia / Río Omecillo-Tumecillo); Other names: n/a | 42.8402°N 3.0841°W | Looks like this Site of Community Interest has an image. Don't worry, you can take one of your own, and upload it too! |
| ES2110006 | Bayas (river) (official name: Baia ibaia / Río Baia); Other names: n/a | 42.926°N 2.8796°W | Looks like this Site of Community Interest has an image. Don't worry, you can take one of your own, and upload it too! |
| ES2110007 | Lake Arreo (official name: Caicedo Yuso eta Arreoko lakua / Lago de Caicedo Yuso y Arreo); Other names: n/a | 42.7783°N 2.991°W | Looks like this Site of Community Interest has an image. Don't worry, you can take one of your own, and upload it too! |
| ES2110008 | Ebro (official name: Ebro ibaia / Río Ebro); Other names: n/a | 42.4729°N 2.5917°W | Looks like this Site of Community Interest has an image. Don't worry, you can take one of your own, and upload it too! |
| ES2110009 | Gorbea Natural Park (official name: Gorbeia); Other names: n/a | 43.0274°N 2.8127°W | Looks like this Site of Community Interest has an image. Don't worry, you can take one of your own, and upload it too! |
| ES2110010 | Zadorra (official name: Zadorra ibaia / Río Zadorra); Other names: n/a | 42.8609°N 2.7206°W | Looks like this Site of Community Interest has an image. Don't worry, you can take one of your own, and upload it too! |
| ES2110011 | Zadorraren sistemako urtegiak / Embalses del sistema del Zadorra (official name: Zadorraren sistemako urtegiak / Embalses del sistema del Zadorra); Other names: n/a | 42.9223°N 2.5697°W | Looks like this Site of Community Interest has an image. Don't worry, you can take one of your own, and upload it too! |
| ES2110012 | Ihuda ibaia / Río Ihuda (Ayuda) (official name: Ihuda ibaia / Río Ihuda (Ayuda)); Other names: n/a | 42.6888°N 2.85°W | Looks like this Site of Community Interest has an image. Don't worry, you can take one of your own, and upload it too! |
| ES2110013 | Arabako lautadako irla-hariztiak / Robledales isla de la llanada alavesa (official name: Arabako lautadako irla-hariztiak / Robledales isla de la llanada alavesa); Other names: n/a | 42.8689°N 2.3502°W | Looks like this Site of Community Interest has an image. Don't worry, you can take one of your own, and upload it too! |
| ES2110014 | Salburua (official name: Salburua); Other names: n/a | 42.8579°N 2.6373°W | Looks like this Site of Community Interest has an image. Don't worry, you can take one of your own, and upload it too! |
| ES2110015 | Gasteizko mendi garaiak / Montes altos de Vitoria (official name: Gasteizko mendi garaiak / Montes altos de Vitoria); Other names: n/a | 42.7916°N 2.6104°W | Looks like this Site of Community Interest has an image. Don't worry, you can take one of your own, and upload it too! |
| ES2110016 | Aldaiako mendiak / Montes de Aldaia (official name: Aldaiako mendiak / Montes de Aldaia); Other names: n/a | 42.8971°N 2.4742°W | This Site of Community Interest has no photo. Take one and upload it! Thanks! |
| ES2110017 | Barrundia ibaia / Río Barrundia (official name: Barrundia ibaia / Río Barrundia); Other names: n/a | 42.9104°N 2.4981°W | This Site of Community Interest has no photo. Take one and upload it! Thanks! |
| ES2110018 | Arabako hegoaldeko mendilerroak / Sierras meridionales de Álava (official name: Arabako hegoaldeko mendilerroak / Sierras meridionales de Álava); Other names: n/a | 42.6162°N 2.6672°W | Looks like this Site of Community Interest has an image. Don't worry, you can take one of your own, and upload it too! |
| ES2110019 | Izki Natural Park (official name: Izki); Other names: n/a | 42.7037°N 2.4941°W | Looks like this Site of Community Interest has an image. Don't worry, you can take one of your own, and upload it too! |
| ES2110020 | Ega-Berron ibaia / Río Ega-Berron (official name: Ega-Berron ibaia / Río Ega-Berron); Other names: n/a | 42.734°N 2.4348°W | Looks like this Site of Community Interest has an image. Don't worry, you can take one of your own, and upload it too! |
| ES2110021 | Guardiako aintzirak / Lagunas de Laguardia (official name: Guardiako aintzirak / Lagunas de Laguardia); Other names: n/a | 42.5388°N 2.5649°W | Looks like this Site of Community Interest has an image. Don't worry, you can take one of your own, and upload it too! |
| ES2110022 | Entzia (official name: Entzia); Other names: n/a | 42.7916°N 2.3421°W | Looks like this Site of Community Interest has an image. Don't worry, you can take one of your own, and upload it too! |
| ES2110023 | Arakil ibaia / Río Arakil (official name: Arakil ibaia / Río Arakil); Other names: n/a | 42.8698°N 2.2753°W | Looks like this Site of Community Interest has an image. Don't worry, you can take one of your own, and upload it too! |
| ES2110024 | Valderejo-Sobrón-Árcenako mendilerroa / Valderejo-Sobrón-Sierra de Árcena (official name: Valderejo-Sobrón-Árcenako mendilerroa / Valderejo-Sobrón-Sierra de Árcena); Other names: n/a | 42.8768°N 3.2319°W | Looks like this Site of Community Interest has an image. Don't worry, you can take one of your own, and upload it too! |
| ES2120001 | Arno (official name: Arno); Other names: n/a | 43.2777°N 2.3968°W | This Site of Community Interest has no photo. Take one and upload it! Thanks! |
| ES2120002 | Aizkorri-Aratz (official name: Aizkorri-Aratz); Other names: n/a | 42.9575°N 2.3797°W | Looks like this Site of Community Interest has an image. Don't worry, you can take one of your own, and upload it too! |
| ES2120003 | Izarraitz (official name: Izarraitz); Other names: n/a | 43.2112°N 2.297°W | Looks like this Site of Community Interest has an image. Don't worry, you can take one of your own, and upload it too! |
| ES2120004 | Urola (river) (official name: Urolako itsasadarra / Ría del Urola); Other names: n/a | 43.2856°N 2.2454°W | Looks like this Site of Community Interest has an image. Don't worry, you can take one of your own, and upload it too! |
| ES2120005 | Oria Garaia / Alto Oria (official name: Oria Garaia / Alto Oria); Other names: n/a | 42.9682°N 2.296°W | Looks like this Site of Community Interest has an image. Don't worry, you can take one of your own, and upload it too! |
| ES2120006 | Pagoeta Nature Reserve (official name: Pagoeta); Other names: n/a | 43.2345°N 2.1758°W | Looks like this Site of Community Interest has an image. Don't worry, you can take one of your own, and upload it too! |
| ES2120007 | Garate-Santa Barbara (official name: Garate-Santa Barbara); Other names: n/a | 43.2868°N 2.1937°W | This Site of Community Interest has no photo. Take one and upload it! Thanks! |
| ES2120008 | Hernio-Gazume (official name: Hernio-Gazume); Other names: n/a | 43.1728°N 2.1437°W | Looks like this Site of Community Interest has an image. Don't worry, you can take one of your own, and upload it too! |
| ES2120009 | Iñurritza (official name: Iñurritza); Other names: n/a | 43.2892°N 2.1559°W | Looks like this Site of Community Interest has an image. Don't worry, you can take one of your own, and upload it too! |
| ES2120010 | Oriako itsasadarra / Ría del Oria (official name: Oriako itsasadarra / Ría del Oria); Other names: n/a | 43.2757°N 2.0943°W | Looks like this Site of Community Interest has an image. Don't worry, you can take one of your own, and upload it too! |
| ES2120011 | Aralar Range (official name: Aralar); Other names: n/a | 42.9956°N 2.1114°W | Looks like this Site of Community Interest has an image. Don't worry, you can take one of your own, and upload it too! |
| ES2120012 | Araxes ibaia / Río Araxes (official name: Araxes ibaia / Río Araxes); Other names: n/a | 43.0848°N 2.0279°W | Looks like this Site of Community Interest has an image. Don't worry, you can take one of your own, and upload it too! |
| ES2120013 | Leitzaran (official name: Leitzaran ibaia / Río Leitzaran); Other names: n/a | 43.1662°N 1.9615°W | Looks like this Site of Community Interest has an image. Don't worry, you can take one of your own, and upload it too! |
| ES2120014 | Mount Ulia (official name: Ulia); Other names: n/a | 43.3345°N 1.9713°W | Looks like this Site of Community Interest has an image. Don't worry, you can take one of your own, and upload it too! |
| ES2120015 | Urumea ibaia / Río Urumea (official name: Urumea ibaia / Río Urumea); Other names: n/a | 43.2423°N 1.9418°W | Looks like this Site of Community Interest has an image. Don't worry, you can take one of your own, and upload it too! |
| ES2120016 | Aiako harria (official name: Aiako harria); Other names: n/a | 43.2602°N 1.8372°W | Looks like this Site of Community Interest has an image. Don't worry, you can take one of your own, and upload it too! |
| ES2120017 | Jaizkibel (official name: Jaizkibel); Other names: n/a | 43.3576°N 1.8549°W | Looks like this Site of Community Interest has an image. Don't worry, you can take one of your own, and upload it too! |
| ES2120018 | Txingudi-Bidasoa (official name: Txingudi-Bidasoa); Other names: n/a | 43.344°N 1.7612°W | Looks like this Site of Community Interest has an image. Don't worry, you can take one of your own, and upload it too! |
| ES2130001 | Armañón (official name: Armañón); Other names: n/a | 43.2748°N 3.3166°W | This Site of Community Interest has no photo. Take one and upload it! Thanks! |
| ES2130002 | Ordunte (official name: Ordunte); Other names: n/a | 43.1788°N 3.3353°W | Looks like this Site of Community Interest has an image. Don't worry, you can take one of your own, and upload it too! |
| ES2130003 | Barbadungo Itsasadarra / Ría del Barbadun (official name: Barbadungo Itsasadarra / Ría del Barbadun); Other names: n/a | 43.3452°N 3.1155°W | Looks like this Site of Community Interest has an image. Don't worry, you can take one of your own, and upload it too! |
| ES2130004 | Astondoko haremunak / Dunas de Astondo (official name: Astondoko haremunak / Dunas de Astondo); Other names: n/a | 43.42°N 2.9445°W | Looks like this Site of Community Interest has an image. Don't worry, you can take one of your own, and upload it too! |
| ES2130005 | Gaztelugatxeko Doniene / San Juan de Gaztelugatxe (official name: Gaztelugatxeko Doniene / San Juan de Gaztelugatxe); Other names: n/a | 43.4478°N 2.7773°W | Looks like this Site of Community Interest has an image. Don't worry, you can take one of your own, and upload it too! |
| ES2130006 | Urdaibaiko ibai sarea / Red fluvial de Urdaibai (official name: Urdaibaiko ibai sarea / Red fluvial de Urdaibai); Other names: n/a | 43.2858°N 2.6317°W | Looks like this Site of Community Interest has an image. Don't worry, you can take one of your own, and upload it too! |
| ES2130007 | Urdaibai estuary (official name: Urdaibaiko itsasertzak eta padurak / Zonas litorales y marismas de Urdaibai); Other names: n/a | 43.3676°N 2.6768°W | Looks like this Site of Community Interest has an image. Don't worry, you can take one of your own, and upload it too! |
| ES2130008 | Urdaibaiko artadi kantauriarrak / Encinares cantábricos de Urdaibai (official name: Urdaibaiko artadi kantauriarrak / Encinares cantábricos de Urdaibai); Other names: n/a | 43.3816°N 2.6621°W | Looks like this Site of Community Interest has an image. Don't worry, you can take one of your own, and upload it too! |
| ES2130009 | Urkiola Natural Park (official name: Urkiola); Other names: n/a | 43.0973°N 2.6509°W | Looks like this Site of Community Interest has an image. Don't worry, you can take one of your own, and upload it too! |
| ES2130010 | Lea ibaia / Río Lea (official name: Lea ibaia / Río Lea); Other names: n/a | 43.3414°N 2.5124°W | Looks like this Site of Community Interest has an image. Don't worry, you can take one of your own, and upload it too! |
| ES2130011 | Artibai ibaia / Río Artibai (official name: Artibai ibaia / Río Artibai); Other names: n/a | 43.3023°N 2.4759°W | Looks like this Site of Community Interest has an image. Don't worry, you can take one of your own, and upload it too! |

== See also ==
- List of Sites of Community Importance in Spain
