= Auzmendi =

Auzmendi is a surname. Notable people with the surname include:

- Agustín Auzmendi (born 1997), Argentine football forward
- Iñaki Antigüedad Auzmendi, geologist at the University of the Basque Country
- Lourdes Auzmendi, Spain-based translator, interpreter, and politician
- Rodrigo Auzmendi (born 2001), Argentine football forward
- Xabi Auzmendi (born 1997), Spanish football midfielder
