= Oiasso =

Roman town in the Bay of Biscay

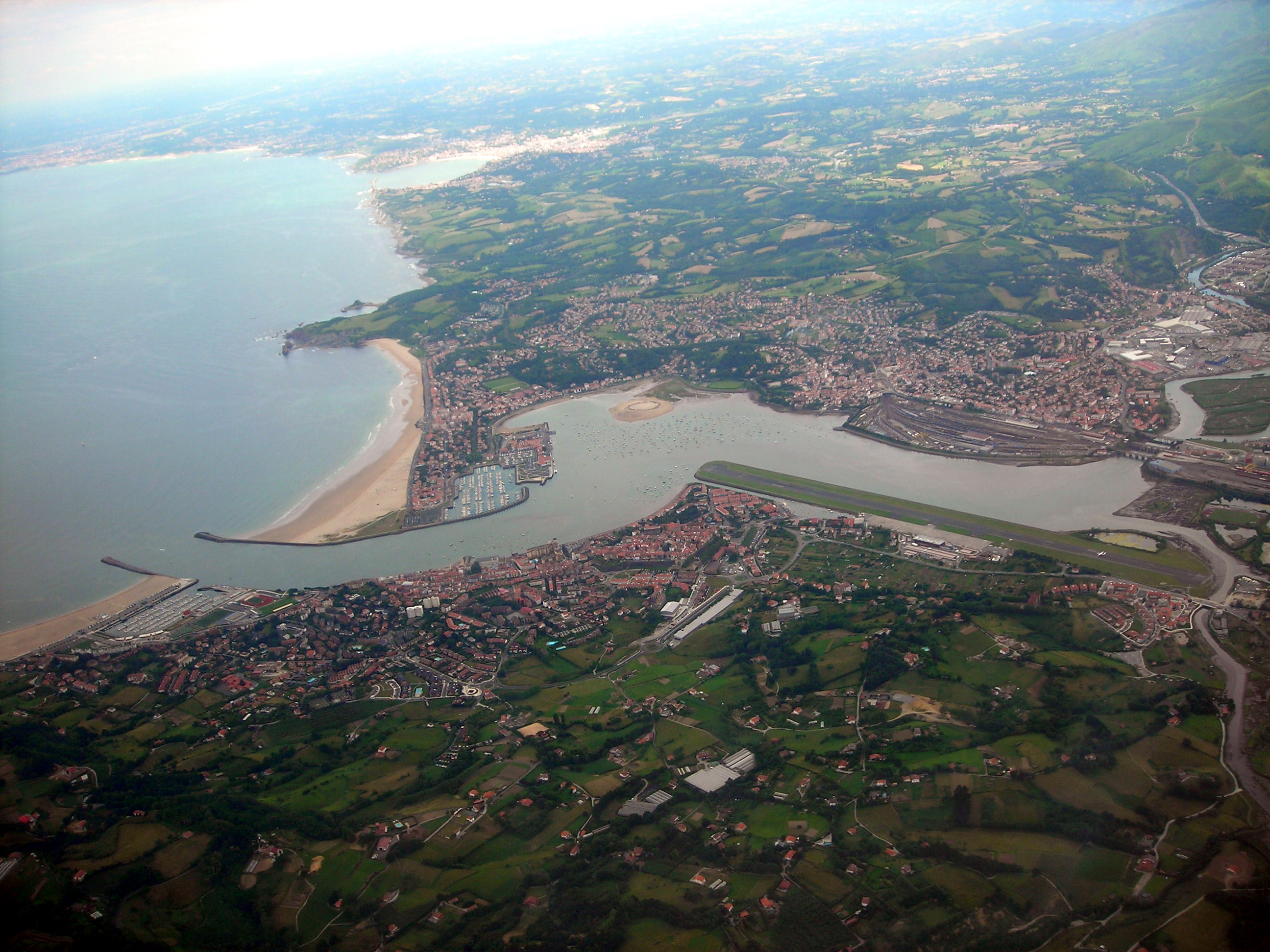
Current view of the mouth of the Bidasoa.

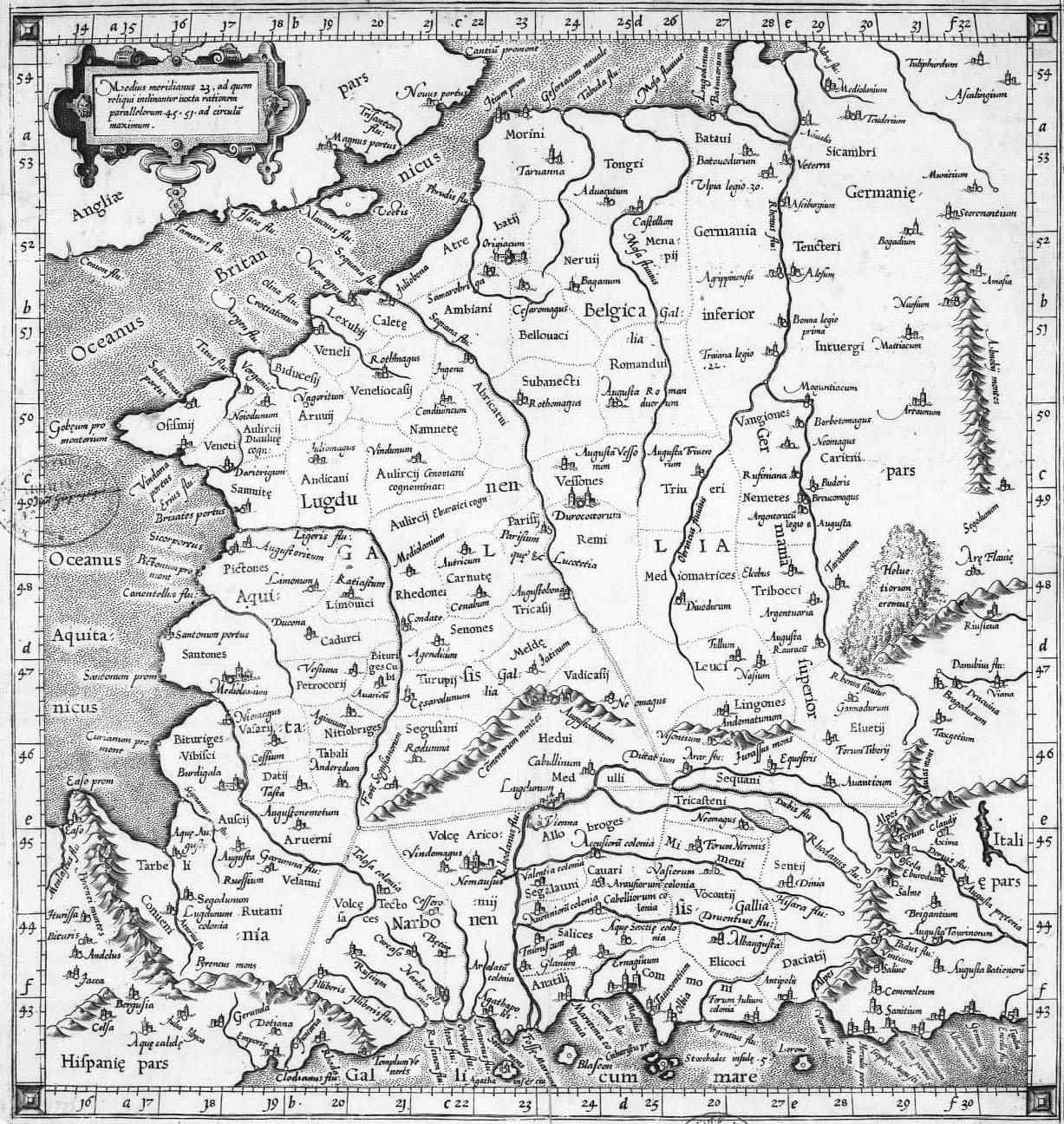
Easo and Easo prom. in the lower left corner of this 1578 map of Gaul according to Ptolemy.

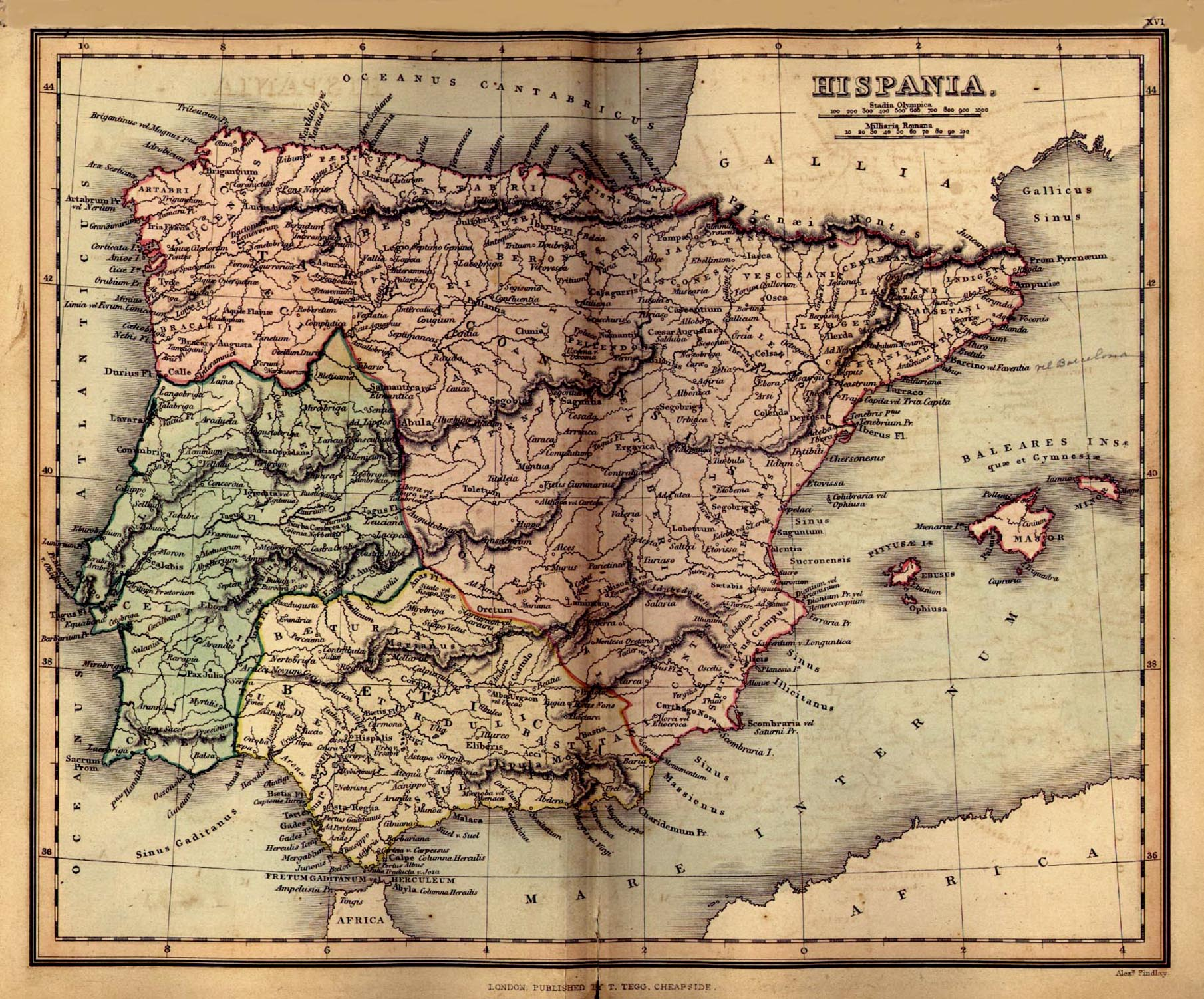
Oeaso near the left extreme of Gallia in this old map or Roman Hispania.

Oiasso, Oiasona or Oiarso was a Vascon Roman (Civitas) town located on the left bank of the Bidasoa estuary in the Bay of Biscay (current Spain). Archaeological evidence unearthed recently pinpoints the core area of Oiasso in the old quarter of Irun, Gipuzkoa, by the Spanish-French border, where harbour and bath remains have been discovered. However, two other focuses in Cape Higuer and hermitage Ama Xantalen (necropolis and mausoleum) point to a wider complex outside the main nucleus.

Actually, some authors note that the name Oiasso may have applied to the whole valley, arguing that the very name of the Bidasoa River may stem from Latin "via ad Oiasso", eventually rendering Bidasoa in Basque. Furthermore, it is widely assumed that the name for the town Oiartzun some 10 km away may have developed from Oiasso. A Roman road linked this spot to ancient Pompaelo all the way through the Saltus Vasconum (the Vasconian wilderness), with the road being built to connect the Vasconian main town to the mines of Arditurri set in the massif of Aiako Harria. Romans showed an early interest on them on account of the ore (largely silver and copper) they could extract from them, using the port and factories of Oiasso to process and dispatch the freight away.

A museum was founded recently in Irun to cater for the interest the vestiges unveiled have aroused and for tourism.

Earlier it was misidentified with current San Sebastián, that is still nicknamed la bella Easo ("The beautiful Easo", a Hispanization of Oiasso).

== History ==
Classical geographers such as Pliny, Claudius Ptolemy, and Strabo have already mentioned the Vascon city of Oiasso. In his Naturalis Historia, Pliny, drawing from a text dated to 50 B.C., expanded the territory of the Vascones to the westernmost part of the Pyrenees towards the location of Oiarso. This place has traditionally been interpreted as the Oyarzun mountains. He referred to this area by the term Vasconum saltus, which is adjacent to the Cantabrian Sea. Later, in the 2nd century during the imperial era, Ptolemy mentioned two locations for Oiassó in Chapter 6, 10 of his book Geographikè Úphégesis. He referenced a city with the Ancient Greek name Οίασσώ πόλις (translated as "City of Oiassó") and another location known as the "Promontory of Oiassó of the Pyrenees" (Οίασσώ άκρον Πυρήνης). Based on this reference and another mention by Ravenate, Julio Caro Baroja suggested that Oiasso should be understood as a dispersed nucleus with two centers: a city and a port.

Oiasso became a significant port of the so-called Mare Externum, the Outer Sea, in contrast to the Mare Nostrum or the Mediterranean. This prominence arose following the construction of the road to Tarraco at the end of the 1st century BC, which facilitated mineral transportation and trade. This road crossed the Ebro valley, passing through Osca and Ilerda. Additionally, Oiasso was intersected by the Via XXXIV Ab Asturica Burdigalam road, which connected Asturica Augusta with Burdigala, as described by Strabo. Oiasso was an integral part of the trade network established by the Roman Empire, facilitating the distribution of goods throughout the northern Atlantic region.

This port was part of a network of ports stretching along the Atlantic coast. Notable ports in the Cantabrian region included Brigantium, Flaviobriga, Vesperies (possibly located at the estuary of Guernica), Menosca (believed to be Guetaria), Lapurdum, and Burdigala.

The Bidasoa crossing served as the border between Aquitaine and Hispania Citerior. Remains of a bridge have been discovered at this site, and it is anticipated that the portorium, or customs post where duties were collected, will be unearthed soon. It is known that the duties charged were 2% for goods passing into Gaul and 2.5% for goods heading in the opposite direction.

Oiasso had a significant mining component. A few kilometers away are the Peñas de Aya, where a major Roman silver mine has been located. This mine extends for over 3 km and includes a sophisticated drainage system, underscoring its importance. The presence of such a complex infrastructure suggests a comprehensive administrative structure behind the mining operations.

A Roman road once connected Caesaraugusta (present-day Zaragoza) to Oiasso, passing through Pompaelo (now Pamplona), and then continuing towards present-day Bordeaux. In its final stretch, this road ran parallel to the Bidasoa river.

== See also ==
Iruña-Veleia
