= Oiartzun (river) =

River in Spain

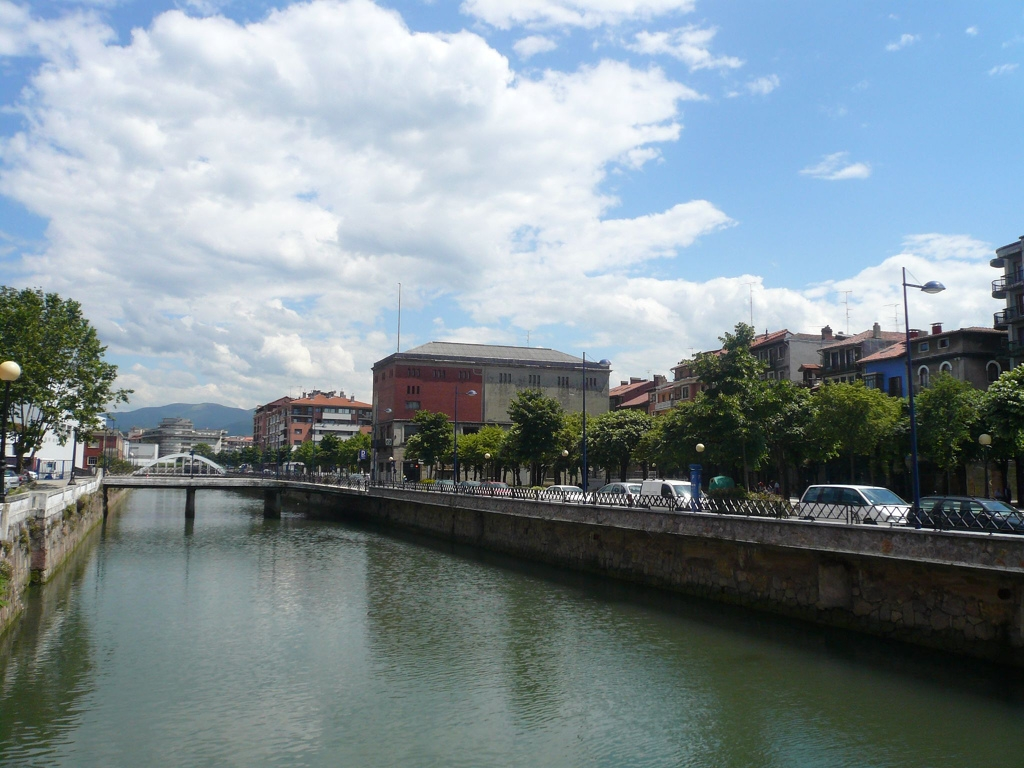
- River Oiartzun on its way through Errenteria

Location
- Country: Spain

Physical characteristics
- Source
  - location: Pyrenées
  - elevation: 700–800 m (2,300–2,600 ft)
- Mouth
  - location: Cantabrian Sea (Bay of Biscay)
- Length: 18.5 km (11.5 mi)
- Basin size: 84.75 km^{2} (32.72 sq mi)

The Oiartzun River (pronounced [oi̯.ˈaɾts̻un]) is a short river in the Basque Country in the north of the Iberian Peninsula. It is the smallest river of Gipuzkoa flowing into the Bay of Biscay (Atlantic basin); the river joins the sea at the Bay of Pasaia. The Oiartzun rises in the Aiako Harria massif at an altitude higher than 700 m. It flows down through steep slopes and falls, with an average drop to its mouth of 5.49% (600 m drop in the first 5 km).

The river meanders through the valley and several hamlets of the town of the same name. On its last stage, it crosses the A-8 motorway squeezed up into a canal all along Errenteria, before joining the Bay of Pasaia. The river underwent severe environmental problems on its last 10 km during the whole 20th century, especially on account of the paper mill located in Errenteria, while the issue was largely redressed by the early 21st century.
