= Cape Higuer =

Cape on the Bay of Biscay

Coordinates: 43.390°N 1.796°W

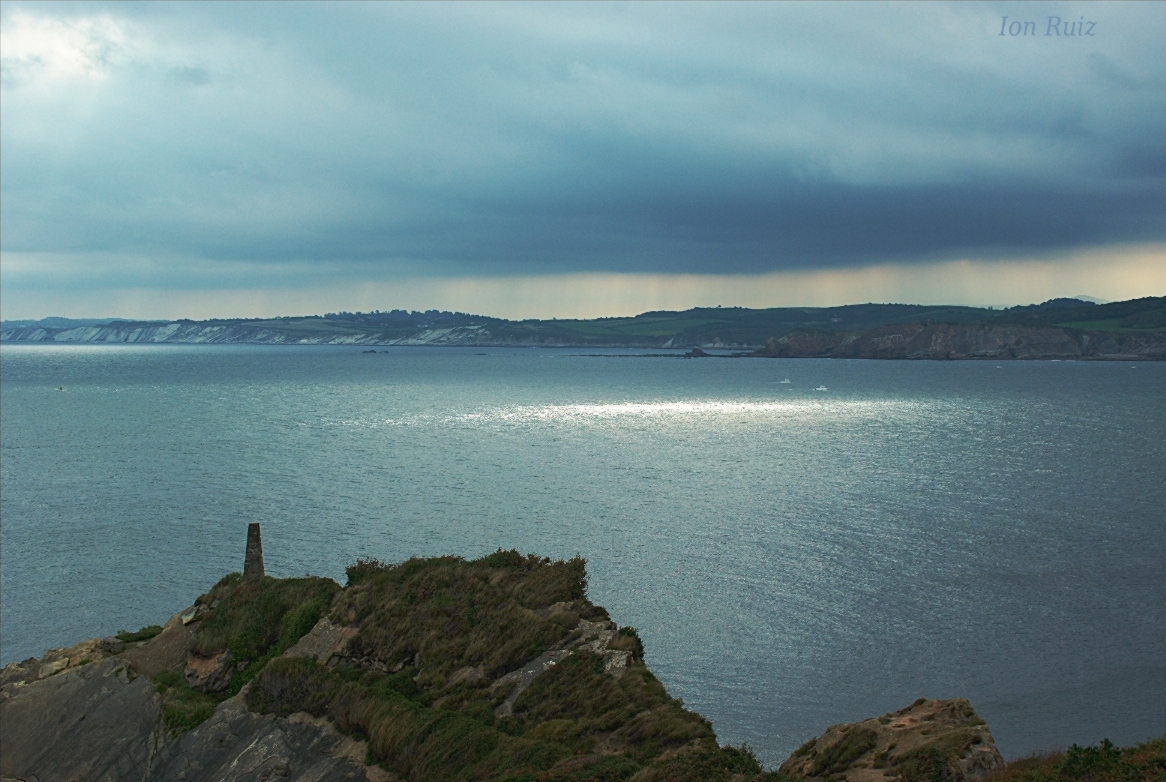
Cape Higuer

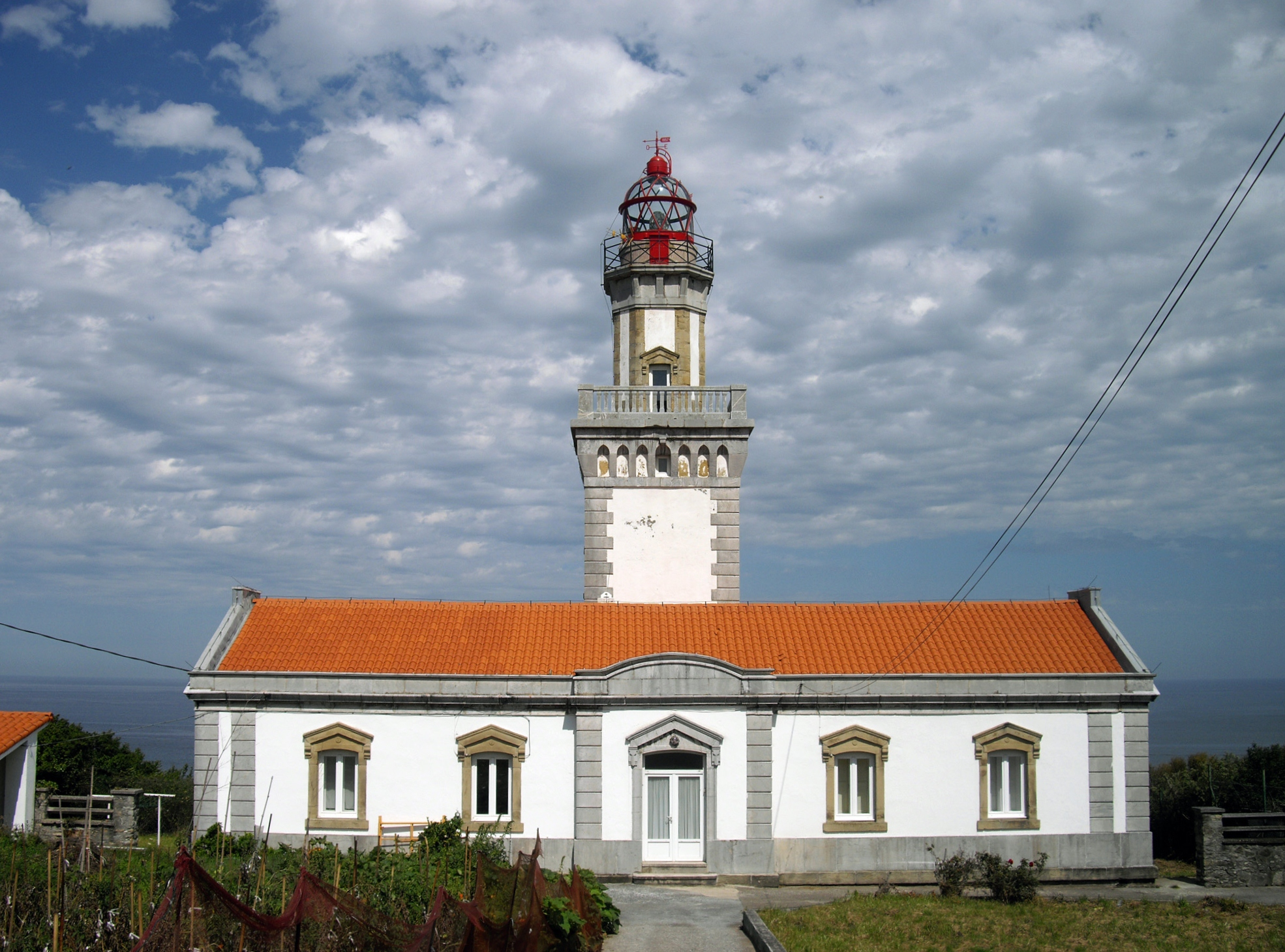
The Cape Higuer Lighthouse

The Cape Higuer (Basque: Higer lurmuturra) is a cape on the Bay of Biscay standing out at the end of the mountain range Jaizkibel by the France–Spain border in the municipality of Hondarribia (4 km (2.5 mi) away from the town centre). The site is home to a lighthouse, besides holding a camp-site and a couple of inns. It is sometimes considered the westernmost land strip of the Pyrenees, with the trek trail GR 11 setting out at this point.

Ancient Roman vestiges have been found 17 m (56 ft) deep in the water at a natural berth, next to the castle San Telmo. A wreck lies on the bed of the water, arguably a Roman one, with mineral load and remnants of timber alongside ceramics items in it. This is the third Roman archaeological site uncovered in the area of the Lower Bidasoa, which bears witness to the ancient Basque Roman town Oiasso.

== See also ==
- Linea P (Spain)
