= EIZIE =

Basque translation association in Spain

EIZIE stands for Euskal Itzultzaile, Zuzentzaile eta Interpreteen Elkartea; that is, the Association of Translators, Correctors and Interpreters of the Basque Language.

== History ==
The Association was founded in 1987 by a small group of Basque professional translators who believed that it was important to provide a formal structure for this growing professional sector. Its first president was Juan Mari Lekuona (Oiartzun, 1927 – San Sebastián, 2005).

The Association, which is officially registered in both Spain and France, consists of professional translators whose original or target language is Basque. In 2007, the Association had approximately 300 members who work professionally in areas such as literary, scientific, audiovisual, legal and administrative translation, among others.

The board of the Association renews its mission every two years, and is composed of a president, vice president, secretary, treasurer and four members, all elected by the membership. The members of EIZIE also carry out various commissioned works.

== Activities ==
EIZIE provides legal advice to its members in areas related to intellectual property, taxes, contracts, etc. Additionally, it regularly offers training courses on different areas of translation, including training in modern technologies that assist in translation.

== Publications ==
EIZIE sponsors or issues the following publications:

- EIZIE: a website on Basque translation, available in Basque, Spanish, French and English.
- Senez: a journal on the theory and practice of translation; it is published annually and the complete text is also available online.
- Universal Literature Collection: a project established under the auspices of the Basque Government to translate masterworks of global literature into Basque; initiated in 1989, the collection at the time of writing in 2007 now offers 125 published titles.
- Basqueliterature.com: a website created and maintained by EIZIE for the purpose of gaining recognition for Basque literature in other languages.

== Sponsors ==
EIZIE receives financial assistance from the following institutions:

- The Basque Government
- The Provincial Council of Gipuzkoa
- The Spanish Center for Reprographic Rights (CEDRO)
