= Juan María Lekuona =

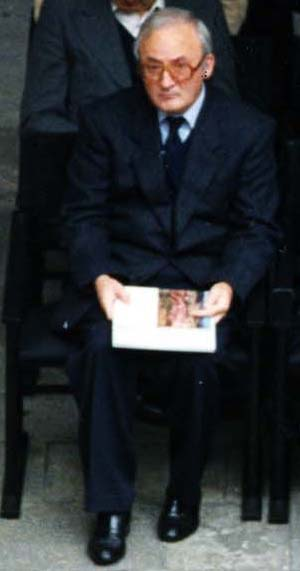
Juan María Lekuona (1989)

Juan María Lekuona Berasategi (1927 – 5 December 2005) was a Spanish Basque poet in euskera. He conducted studies about bersolarism (oral Basque tradition).

Lekuona was born in 1927 in Oiartzun, Gipuzkoa. He was Manuel Lekuona's nephew. In 1953 he became a priest. After his residence in Rome, where he defended his thesis, he worked in Añorga, near San Sebastián. He read Gabriel Aresti's books in those years, and as a result, his work focused on social issues, as seen in his first book Mindura gaur.

Lekuona was the first president of EIZIE in 1987 and became a member of Euskaltzaindia in 1988. He won two Premios Euskadi de Literatura prizes in 1979 and 1990.

Lekuona died in San Sebastián on 5 December 2005.
