= Lourdes Auzmendi =

Spanish politician

María Dolores Katarain
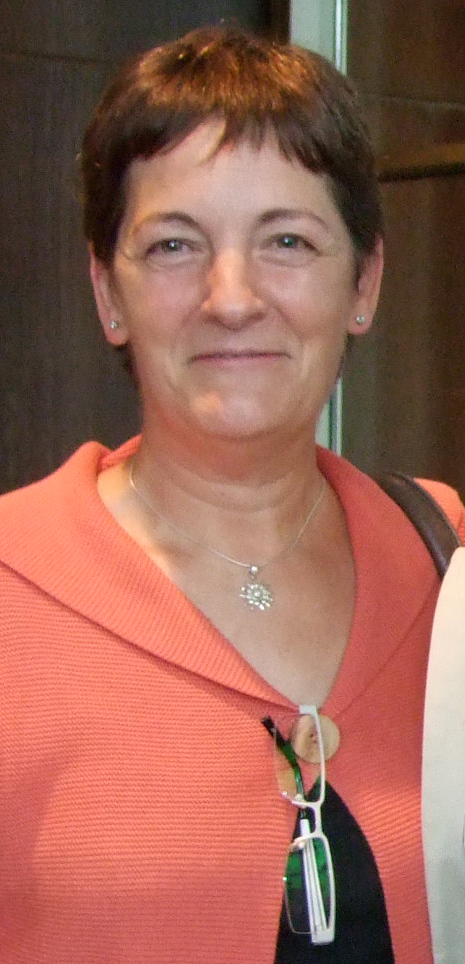
- Born: Lourdes Auzmendi Aierbe; 1956 (age 69–70); Ataun, Gipuzkoa

Lourdes Auzmendi Aierbe (born 1956 in Ataun, Gipuzkoa) is a translator, interpreter and politician. She is best known as the Basque government's Deputy Minister for Linguistic Policy (from March 2010 to December 2012).

== Early life ==
Auzmendi grew up in Spain in a Basque-speaking environment and did not speak Spanish as a child. At age 11 she was sent to the Jesuit college of San Sebastián to learn Spanish. She later learned philosophy and translation.

== Career ==
In the late 1970s, she was a journalist for Argia magazine. She worked as a radio journalist in the Basque Country.

When María Dolores Katarain was killed by ETA in 1986, Auzmendi was overcome, and changed careers from news to translation.

In 1987, she was one of the founders and the president of EIZIE (Basque Translators, Correctors and Interpreters Association). From 2001 until 2009, she worked in the University of the Basque Country. In the Inguma database, she created more than 25 works that were collected.

In the 2009 elections to the Basque Parliament, she won and was appointed Director of the Promotion of the Basque Government, within the Ministry for Language Policy. In March 2010, after Etxezarreta's resignation, she was appointed Deputy Minister.
