= Cape Higuer Lighthouse =

Lighthouse in Gipuzkoa, Basque Country, Spain

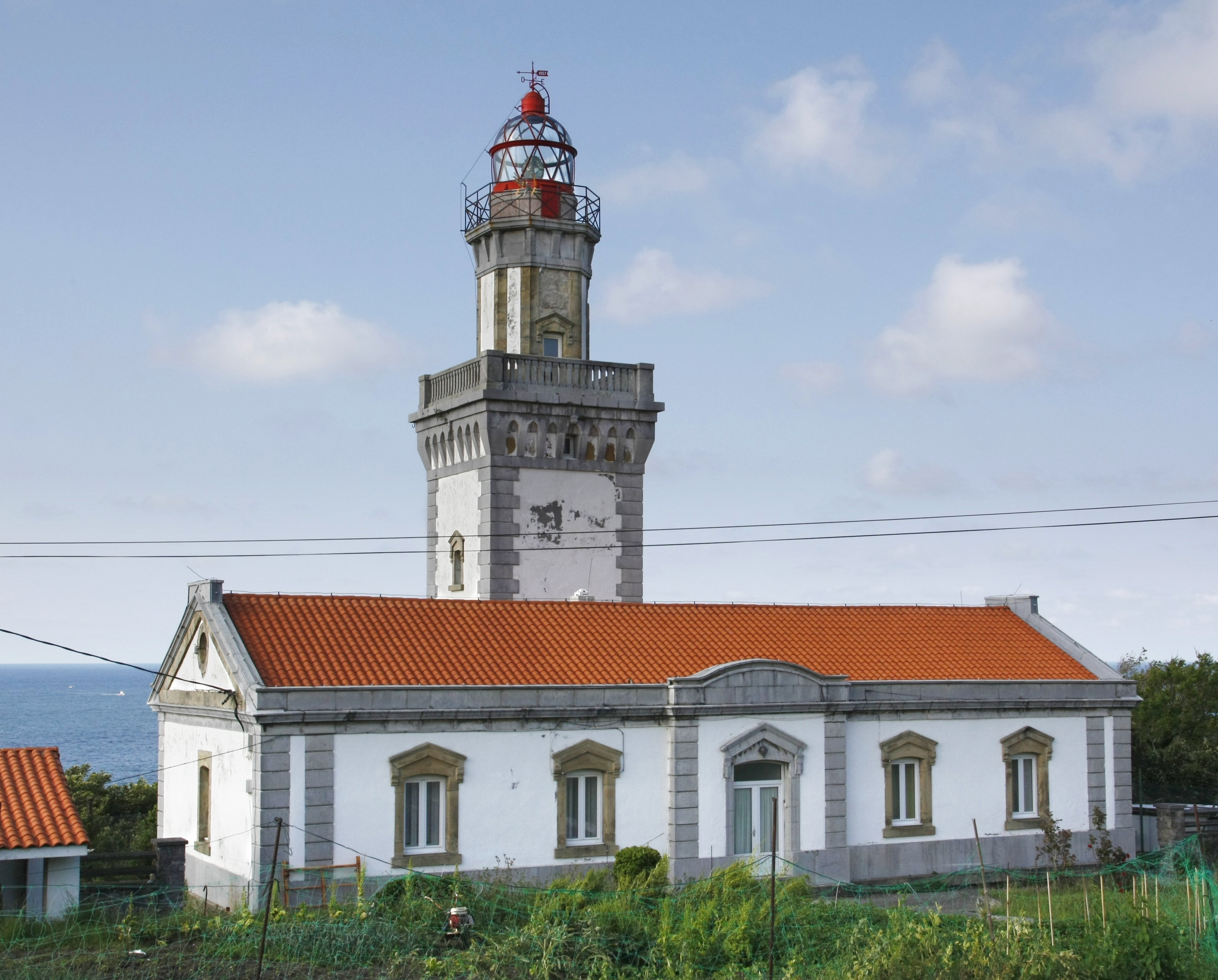
- Location: Hondarribia; Gipuzkoa; Basque Country (autonomous community)
- Coordinates: 43.39194°N 1.79179°W

Tower
- Constructed: 1878–1881
- Built by: Francisco Lafarga
- Construction: stone tower
- Height: 21 metres (69 ft)
- Shape: square tower with balcony and lantern attached
- Power source: mains electricity

Light
- Focal height: 65 metres (213 ft)
- Range: 23 nautical miles (43 km; 26 mi)
- Characteristic: Fl(2)W.10s

The Cape Higuer Lighthouse (Spanish: Faro de Higuer) is a lighthouse at the Cabo Higuer on the Spanish Atlantic coast in the Bay of Biscay. It lies in the municipality of Hondarribia, west of the mouth of the Bidasoa, which forms the border with France. It is the easternmost lighthouse on the Spanish Atlantic coast.

== Tower ==
Above the Cabo Higuer stands the neoclassical building, erected between 1878 and 1881 by Francisco Lafarga. The tower with a square floor plan is located on the middle of the building and is 21 meters high. At about halfway up, an octagonal tower with the red painted lantern with round glass dome begins as a conclusion.

The original lighting was an oil lamp with a range of 16 miles and was replaced in 1905 by a petroleum lamp. In 1937 the beacon was electrified. The range of the white light with the fire height 65 meters is 23 nautical miles. The Faro de Higuer Light characteristic (Fl(2)W.10s) are two white flashes in a cycle of 10 seconds. The lighthouse is registered under the international number D-1452 as well as the national code 00040.

About 150 meters away was a predecessor building that had been destroyed in the Third Carlist War in 1874.

== Surrounding ==
There is a bar, a restaurant and a campsite nearby. At the lighthouse begins the GR11 Long-distance trail, which leads over 820 kilometers to the Cap de Creus.

== See also ==
List of lighthouses in Spain
