= Maixux Rekalde =

Spanish pacifist and Basque supporter (1934–2022)

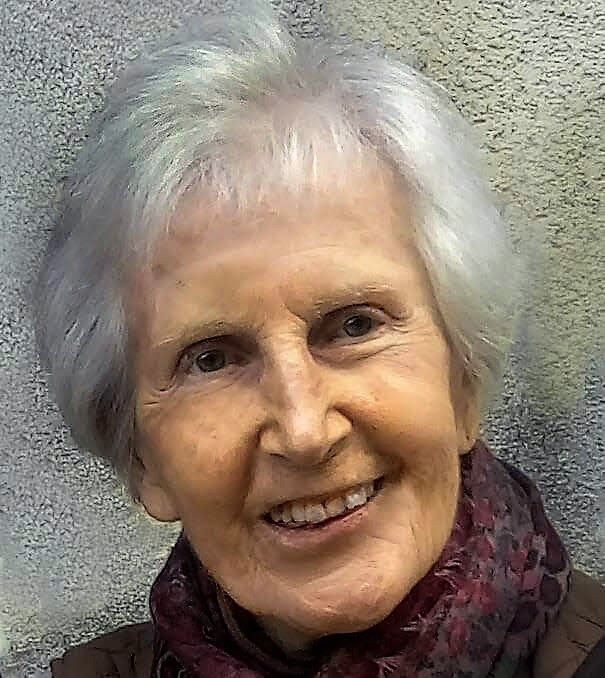

Maixux Rekalde Urdanpilleta (4 July 1934 – 6 January 2022) was a Spanish pacifist and Basque supporter. She served as President of Elkarri (Elkarri was a pacifist social movement that operated in the Basque Country and Navarra) and Lokarri (A Basque word meaning "what serves to unite", Lokarri was a pacifist social movement).

== Biography ==
Rekalde was born in Oiartzun, Gipuzkoa. While she had a master's degree in journalism and business administration studies, she worked for society all her life, including as a secular missionary for ten years in Chile, and teaching and training women in Los Ríos Province, Ecuador. During her stay in Chile, she experienced Augusto Pinochet's 1973 coup d'état, returning home three months later. Back in the Basque Country, she worked in the press office of the diocese of Gipuzkoa when José María Setién was auxiliary bishop, and in various voluntary capacities. An active pacifist, she was one of the founders of the Elkarri social movement. She later served as president of the Elkarri and Lokarri movements.

Rekalde was also one of the first columnists of the monthly magazine, Oarsoaldean (On the other hand). Fluent in French, she also studied English for a year in London.

She spent her last years in the Petra Lekuona Center in Oiartzu, suffering from Alzheimer's disease. The Language Observatory recorded Rekalde's testimony on video.

Single and childless, Maixux Rekalde died 6 January 2022.

== See also ==
- List of peace activists
