= Peñas de Aya =

Massif in the Basque Country

Aiako Harria
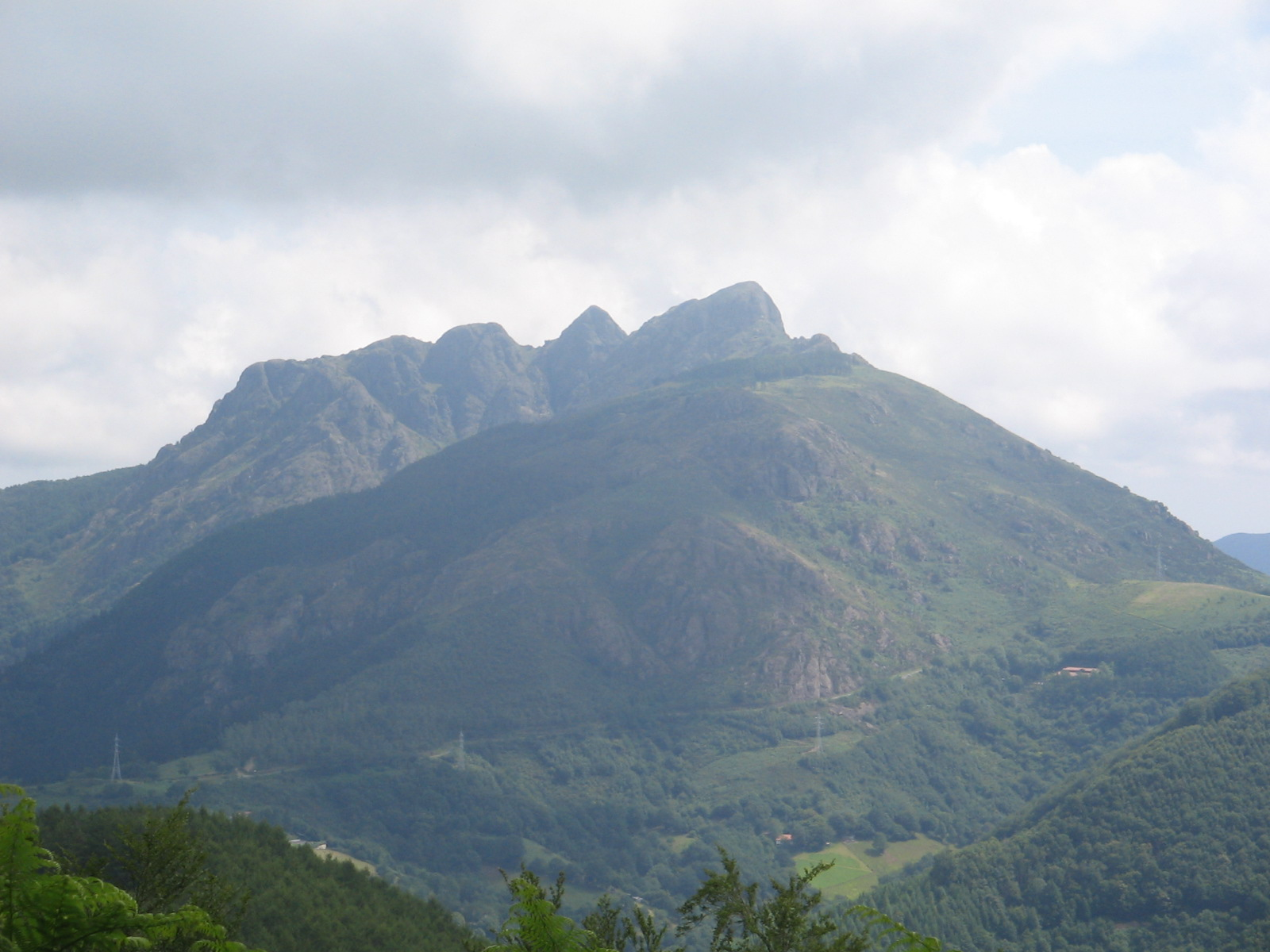
- Aiako Harria from the southwest

Highest point
- Elevation: 837 m (2,746 ft)
- Listing: Mountains of Spain
- Coordinates: 43°16′59.97″N 01°47′4.74″W

Naming
- English translation: The stone of Aia
- Language of name: Basque
- Pronunciation: Basque: [ˈajako aˈria]

Geography
- Location within Spain
- Location: Gipuzkoa, Spain
- Parent range: Pyrenees

Climbing
- Easiest route: From the pass of Elurretxe or Aritxulegi in Oiartzun

Aiako Harria in Basque or Peñas de Aya in Spanish, is a massif east of the town of Oiartzun in the Basque Country. The river Oiartzun rises on its north-western face.

The range is very popular with the inhabitants of the area. Other neighbouring towns are Irun on the north and Lesaka on the east. The massif comprises three summits extending 4-odd kilometres north to south in a row, namely Irumugarrieta (806 m), Txurrumurru (821 m) and Erroilbide (837 m). Its characteristic shape can be made out approximately from as far as Bayonne (north). Its actual French name is Les Trois Couronnes. At its western foot, the mountain holds the site Arditurri related to ancient Oiasso with a network of mine corridors carved in the rock and put down to Romans. Some notable mountains around are Bianditz (827 m) on the south, Jaizkibel (547 m) on the west and Larrun (905 m) on the north-east.

== Mythology ==
The mountain and the surrounding area, besides being dotted with abundant prehistoric vestiges (stone circles, menhirs, etc.), is home to numerous fairy tales and rich mythological beliefs. The first one refers to the very creation of the mountain. According to a recurrent account in Basque mythology (e.g. Aballarri in Adarra), it is made up of a stone kicked by mythological character Sanson (Basque development of biblical Samson) from Jaizkibel, while another suggests that it fell down from a pocket of his when he was bombing the valley with huge rocks.

Another typical mythological character from Aiako Harria and Oiartzun is the intxixu, who dwells in the mine corridors of Arditurri. The intxixus are mischievous but shy, so they are hard to see. A collected folk account goes that a warden came across one of them at the mines, and seized with fear he took to running right the town hall of Oiartzun. The warden reported the character to be half human half betizu (a wild cow of the region). Tradition credits them with the building of the megalithic monuments around.

== Geology ==
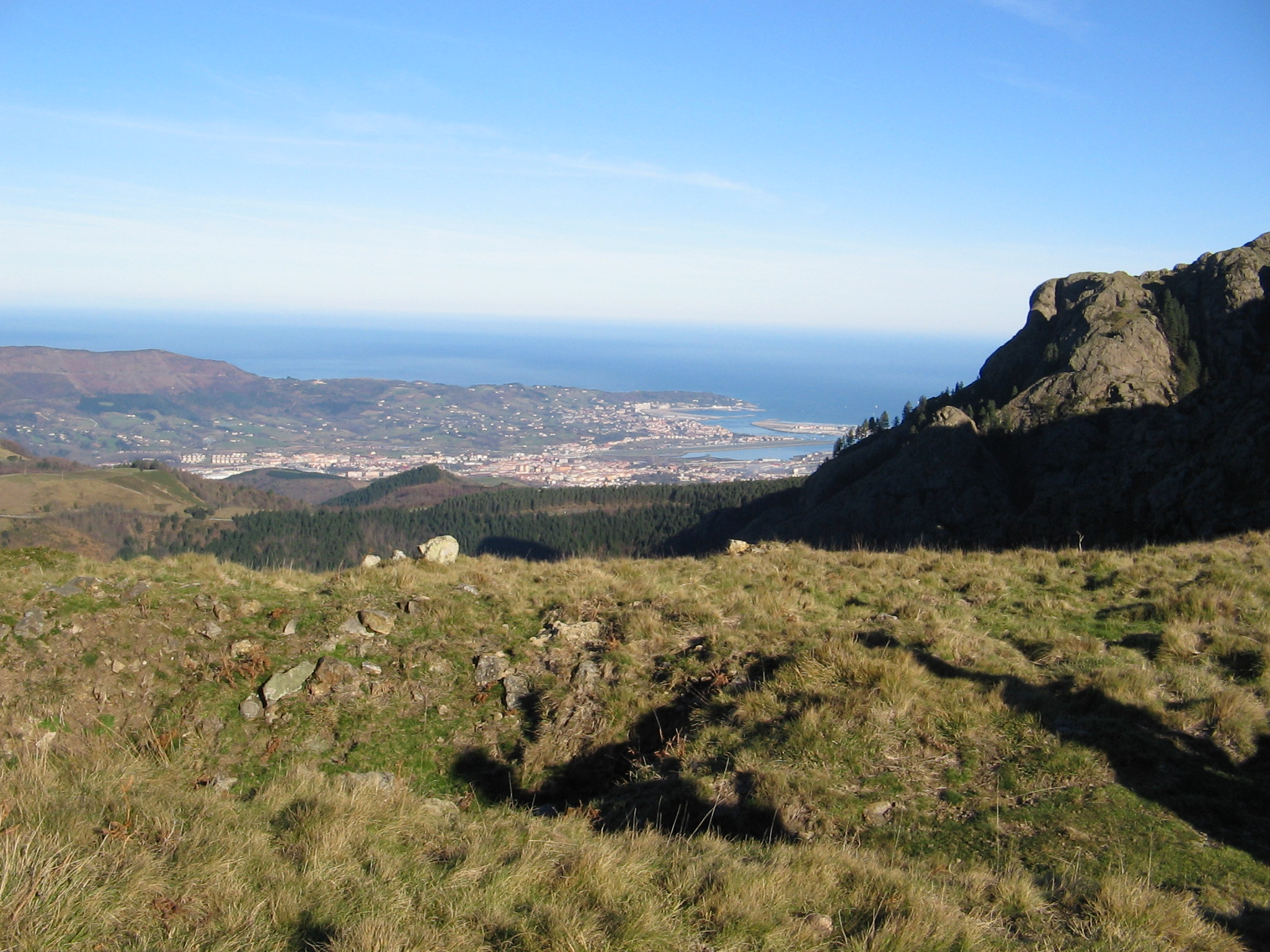
Overview of Irun, Hondarribia and a tip of Hendaia

Besides being considered by some the westernmost tip of the Pyrenees (rivalling with the coastal mountain Jaizkibel), it stands out as a distinctive range of rocky prominences and gullies, otherwise uncommon. The conspicuous formations of Aiako Harria consist of a Paleozoic massif with some of the oldest materials cropping out currently in the Basque Country. Later orogeny pushed a mass of igneous rocks to the surface, so metamorphosing the superficial Paleozoic materials as it tore its way out of them, which yielded the present day granitic landscape.

The materials held by the mountain enticed the Romans to these reaches, who settled in the riverside town of Oiasso with important port and factory vestiges unveiled recently. Ore was extracted from the Arditurri mines (IPA: [aɾ'ðituri]), largely silver bearing galena and lead aimed at the elaboration of different metallic instruments, the site standing for one of the most significant ancient mines in Hispania, second to Las Médulas mines in Leon but matching in importance those of Cartagena or Rio Tinto. As late as the 5th century, the mines were abandoned by Romans, but were exploited in the Middle Ages for iron, so spurring the construction of many foundries around. The mines kept on running up to 1984, when the exploitation license expired.

== Access points and trails ==
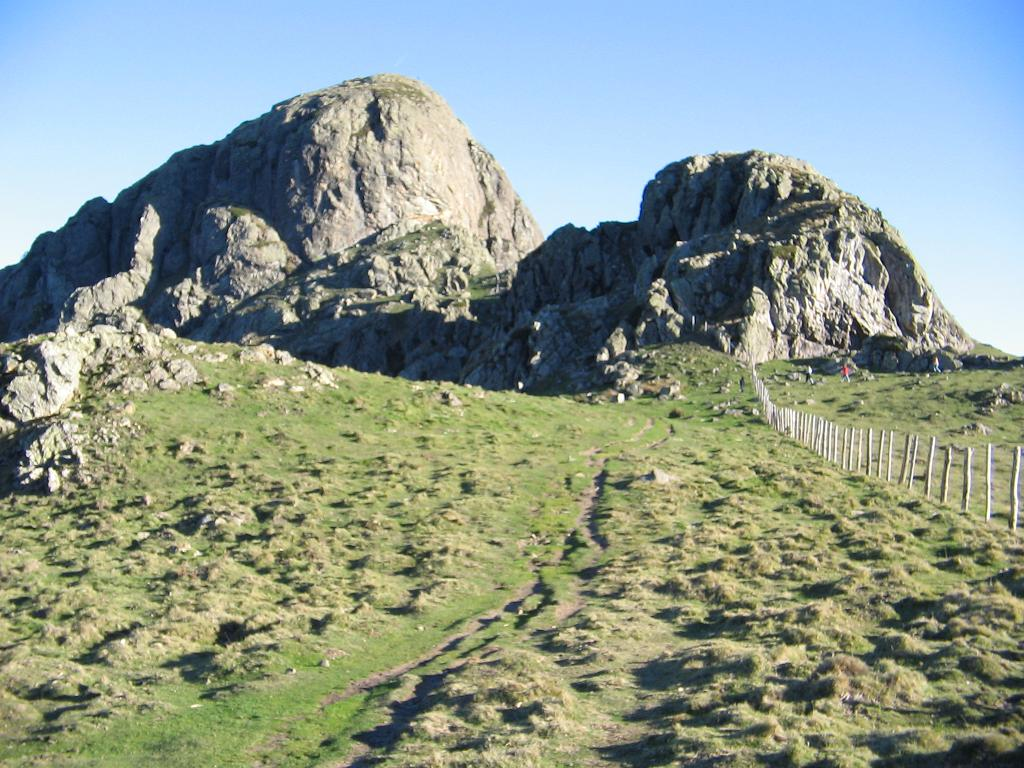
The trail northwards on Aiako Harria

There is a myriad of combinations and well signalled trails. The PR GI-20 route, marked with yellow and white, skirts all around the massif. The signalling for the central route of the summits is older. Two starting points may be highlighted, at the south and the north ends of the massif, i.e. Aritxulegi and the pass of Elurretxe.

=== Aritxulegi ===
From Oiartzun, after a long winding road up in the direction of Lesaka (GI-3420), the vehicle may be parked on the roadside before the tunnel (height 502 m). A pebbled track goes up on the right hand until a field and a hut on the pass. The trail heads north to the summits past a plantation of small trees in memory of dead Basque nationalist activists and militants. The trail opens its way out of grass patches and crooked passages, with clear signs all along. No climbing needed, although crawling is needed in order to overcome some obstacles. At one point, a tricky stretch must be passed where a ring must be grabbed in order to continue. After reaching the last summit of Irumugarrieta, the landscape turns opener. Breathtaking scenery of the whole Basque coastline, Landes, Basque Mountains and the western Pyrenees.

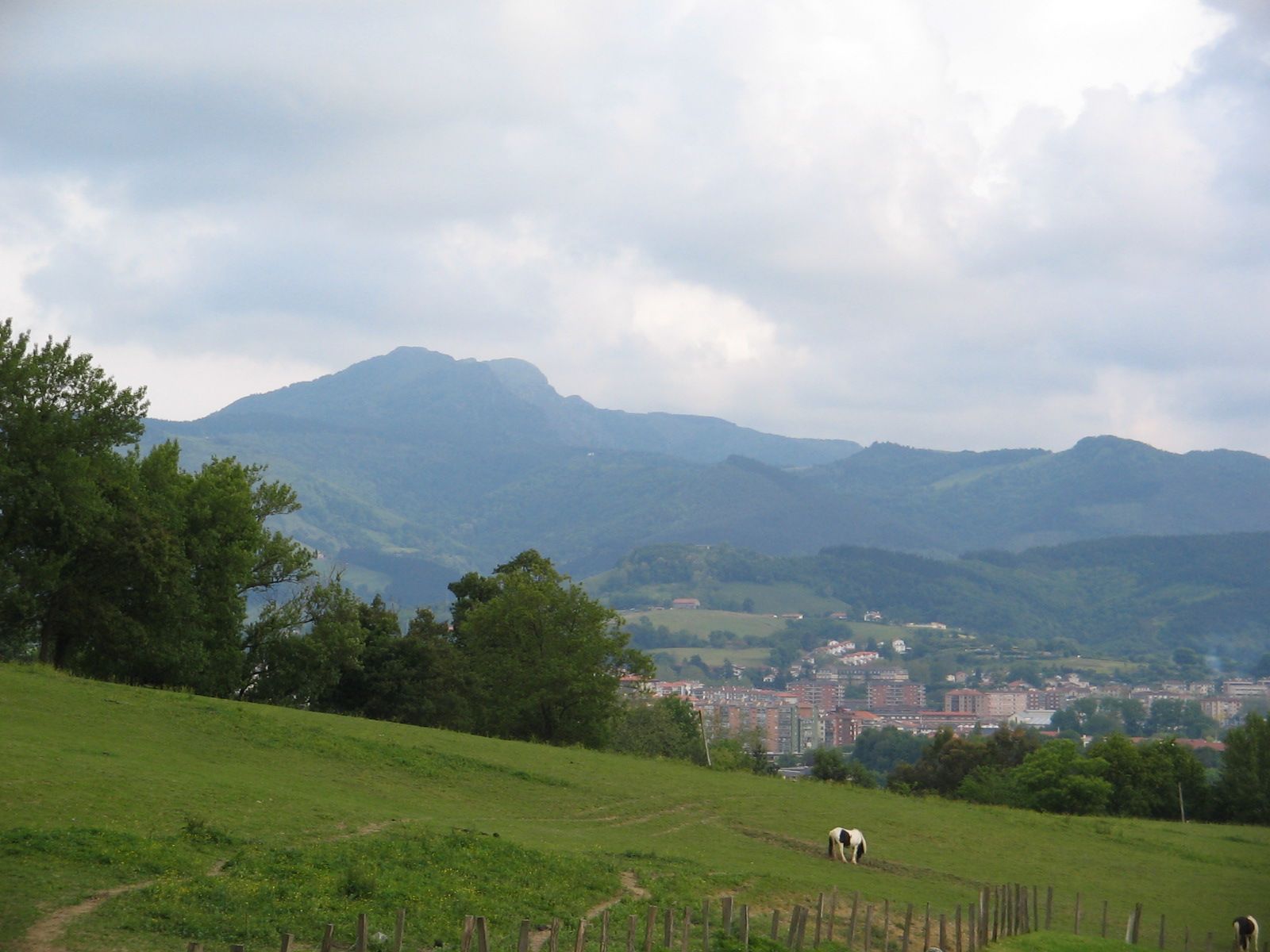
Aiako Harria from Hondarribia, Irun on the foreground

Keep north-bound in a steep descent leaving behind the Juncal cave on the right (748 m high). The trail falls past the remains of a military defence line dating from the Civil War till an open larch forest is reached, and on to the pass of Elurretxe (road). This is the access called Castillo del Inglés too, after a building nearby nowadays in ruin. For the way back, in order to skip the same trail to return, the PR-GI 20 looping around the massif can be taken, either through the western side or the eastern one. In the first option, the trail runs back south at middle height through forest landscape most of the time, except for the final stage, before merging with the starting point in Aritxulegi. No slopes up at the beginning, but several twists and zigzags up on the way.

=== Elurretxe (Castillo del Inglés) ===
The same route may be done on the opposite direction, that is, starting from Elurretxe to Aritxulegi and back by means of any of the trail choices. From Oiartzun (Elizalde), take the road going up towards Irun and neighbourhood Gurutze. In a 5-minute ride of a motor vehicle, a minor road splits off to the right (GI-3454, signposted "Ingelesaren Gaztelua"). The road winds up for another 15 minutes gaining height gradually until Elurretxe is reached (Km 8, open larch forest and picnic area on the right).

=== The Arditurri greenway ===
At the western foot of the massif, a flat greenway has been arranged for cyclists and pedestrians along the river Oiartzun, which heads east into the wild up to the Arditurri mines.

== Events ==
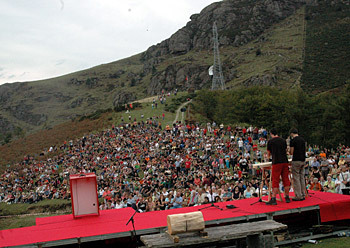
Meeting held in Aritxulegi on the Gudari Eguna 2006

- The core area of Aiako Harria and an extended strip along the borderline with Navarre were declared Natural Park in 1995, covering an area of 6,913 Ha. The whole stretch features remarkable green beauty, plenty of water and abundant vegetation.
- At Christmas time, hikers and devotees from Irun gather together at the Juncal cave so as to venerate Our Lady of the Juncal, beloved patron of the town.
- The pass of Aritxulegi holds an affective significance for militant Basque nationalists tracing back to the Spanish Civil War, since an ANV member was first killed by Francoists at this spot. A standing stone has been erected as a memorial. Furthermore, a meeting is held here on a yearly basis on the Day of the Basque Soldier, the Gudari Eguna.
- The Arditurri mines opened to public and tourist attendance in 2008, after years of revealing findings, arrangements and provisions. A portion of 15 km of galleries, chambers and Roman-made interior lakes are on show for visitors.
