= Südwall =

German WWII defenses in Southern France

South wall Südwall
- Mediterranean Wall
- Mediterranean coast line in France
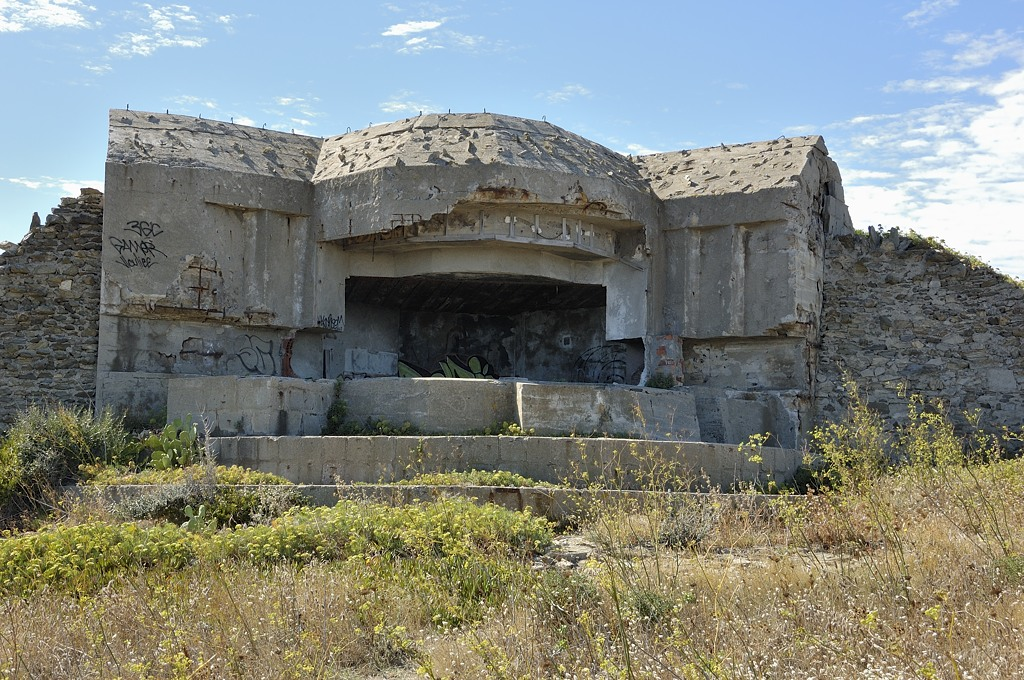
- Battery "Karine" in Port-Vendres

Site information
- Type: Defensive line
- Controlled by: Nazi Germany
- Condition: Abandoned, with the exception of some works restored for other uses.

Site history
- Built: 1943–1945
- Materials: Reinforced concrete, steel, iron
- Events: Second World War

Garrison information
- Garrison: Wehrmacht

The Mediterranean Wall, also known as the Southern Wall (Südwall in German), was an extensive system of coastal fortifications built by Nazi Germany during the Second World War, between 1943 and 1945.

The project foresaw that the fortifications would extend along all the coasts of the Mediterranean Sea of southern France, from Cerbère to Menton, so as to prevent Allied landings in the South of France. This defensive line extended as far as Italy via the Ligurian Wall and complemented the Atlantic Wall.

== Structure ==
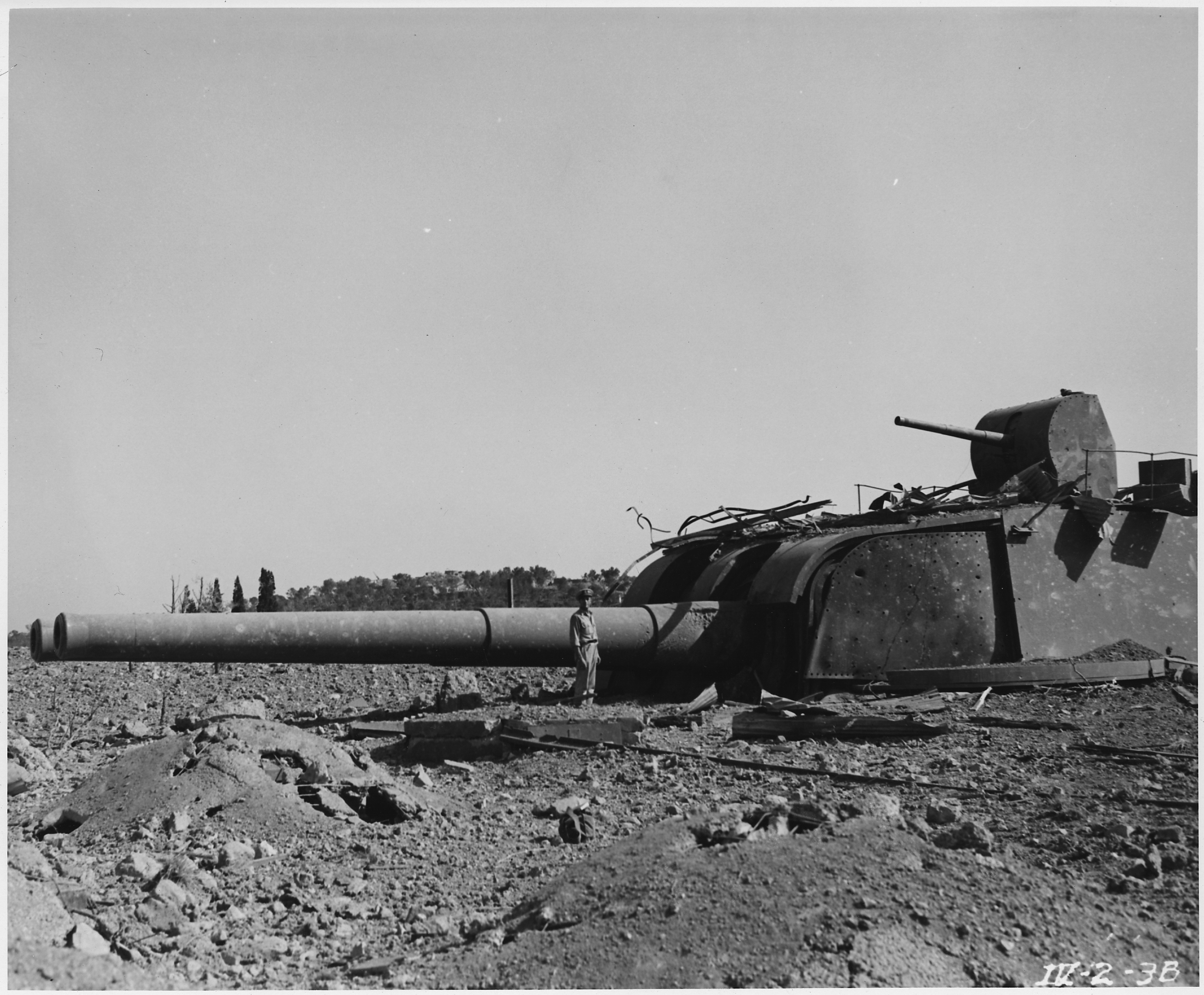
Example of fortifications in the Südwall near Toulon

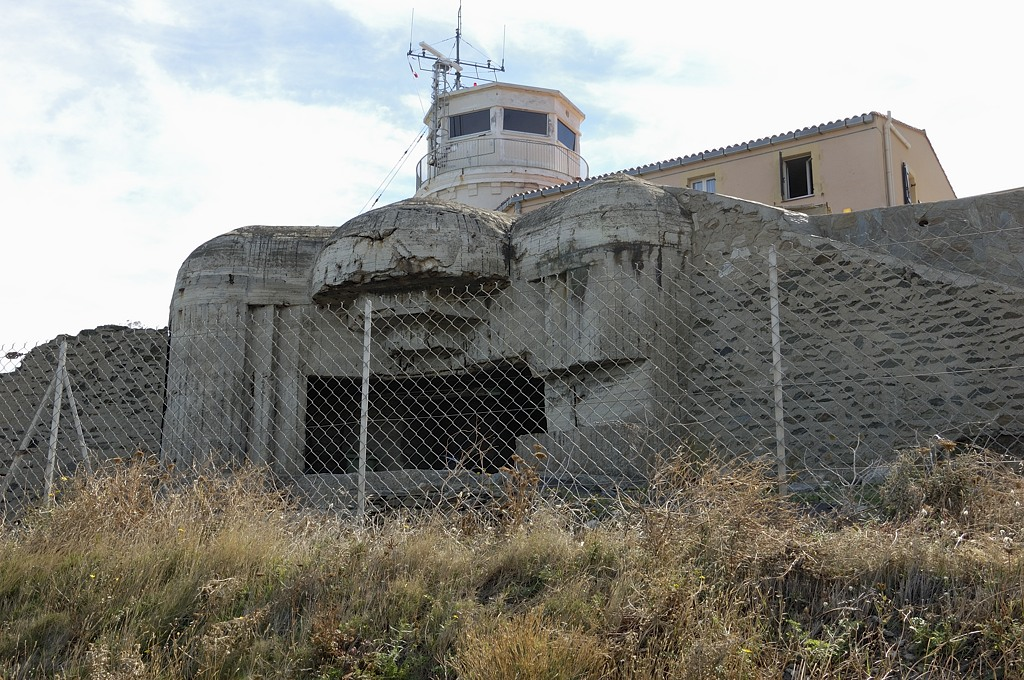
Cap Béar, Regelbau M272

The 19th Army of the Wehrmacht (Armeeoberkommando 19 (AOK 19)) defended 7 coastal defense sectors (KüstenVerteidigungsAbschnitt; KVA) covering the 864 km of the French Mediterranean coast from the Spanish border to the Italian border. AOK 19 includes the following KVAs:

- 19 KVA A / 271. ID: Port-Vendres, Collioure, Cap Leucate...
- 19 KVA B / 277. ID: Port-la-Nouvelle, Narbonne-Plage...
- 19 KVA C / 271. ID: Cap d'Agde, Sète...
- 19 KVA D / 338. ID: La Camargue
- 19 KVA E / 244. ID: Marseille
- 19 KVA F / 242. ID: Toulon
- 19 KVA G / 148. ID: Cannes, Nice...

At the time of Allies landing in Provence, the defensive line consisted of about 500 defensive blocks, while about 200 were still under construction.

== See also ==
- Regelbau
- Atlantic Wall
