= Jaizkibel =

Mountain range of the Basque Country

Coordinates: 43°22′01″N 1°49′14″W

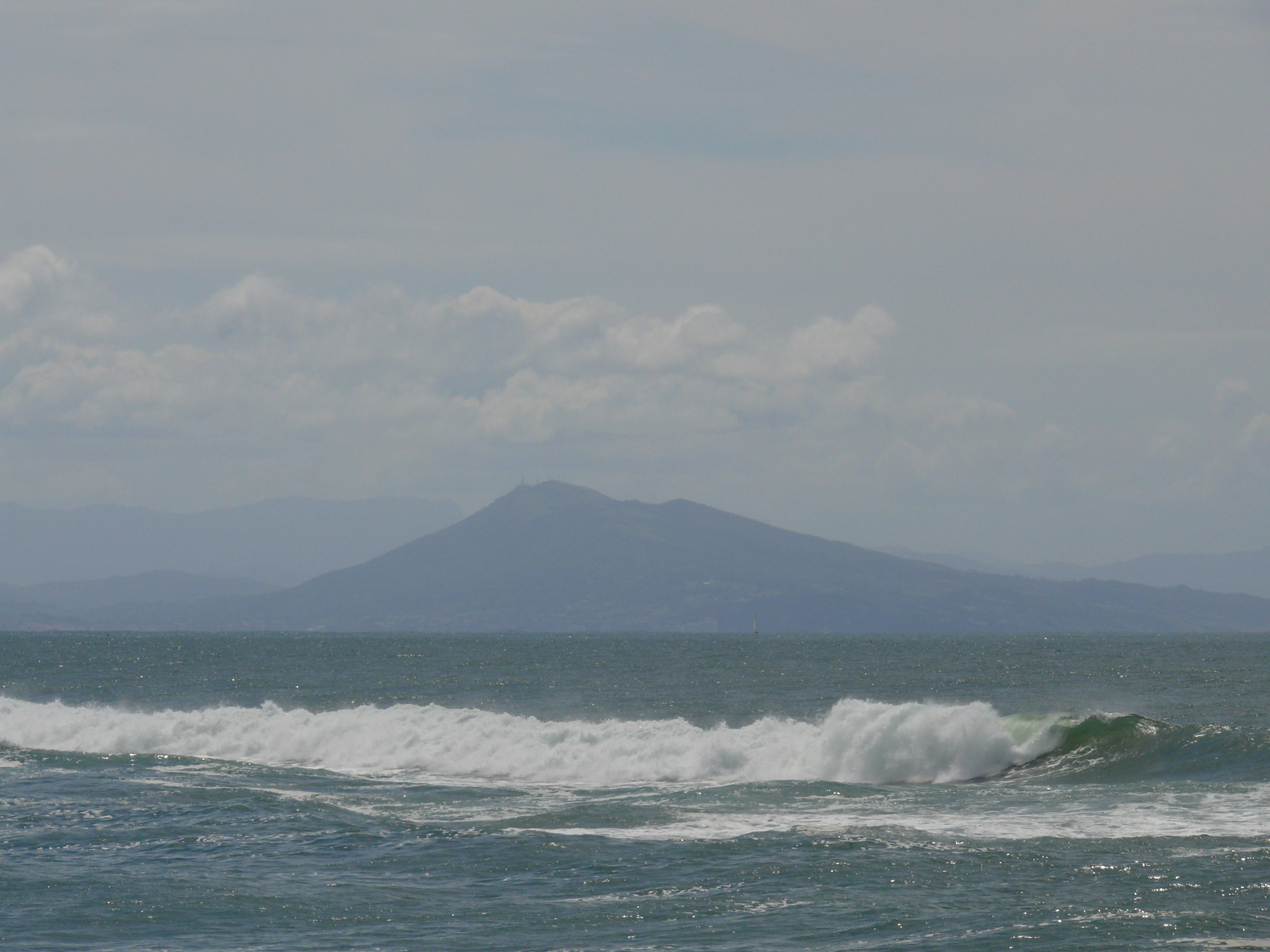
- View of Jaizkibel from the east (near Anglet)

Highest point
- Elevation: 547 m (1,795 ft)

Naming
- English translation: Back of the rock
- Language of name: Basque
- Pronunciation: Basque pronunciation: [xais̻ˈkibel]

Geography
- Location: Gipuzkoa, Spain
- Parent range: Pyrenees

Climbing
- Easiest route: From Lezo

Jaizkibel is a mountain range of the Basque Country located east of Pasaia, north of Lezo and west of Hondarribia, in Spain, with 547 m (1,795 ft) at the highest point (peak Alleru). The range stretches south-west to north-east, where it plunges into the sea at the Cape Higuer (spelled Higher too). To the north-west, the mountain dips its slopes in the sea with beautiful cliffs all along, overlooking on the east the marshes of Txingudi, the river Bidasoa and its mouth (tracing the France–Spain border) as well as the towns of Irun, Hendaia and Hondarribia on the riverbanks. The nearest relevant mountains are La Rhune, Aiako Harria and Ulia, closing the view east to west from the south. Some people consider Jaizkibel to be the first westernmost mountain of the Pyrenees.

The area is a relevant landmark on the grounds of its strategic position close to the border with France, with the range standing as the easternmost Spanish rise by the seaside and affording an unmatched view miles away, both over the sea and inland. As a result, the military has always showed an interest in the place since the 16th century when the Spanish-French border started to be drafted, taking to building defence facilities, such as the towers dotting the ridge (dating from the Carlist Wars) or the Fortress of Guadalupe going back to 1890, nowadays out of use. The northern slopes have borne witness to frequent military manoeuvres from the decade of the 50s through the early 90s, when the road to the booster station was sometimes cut off to avoid disruption and damage.

== Access points ==
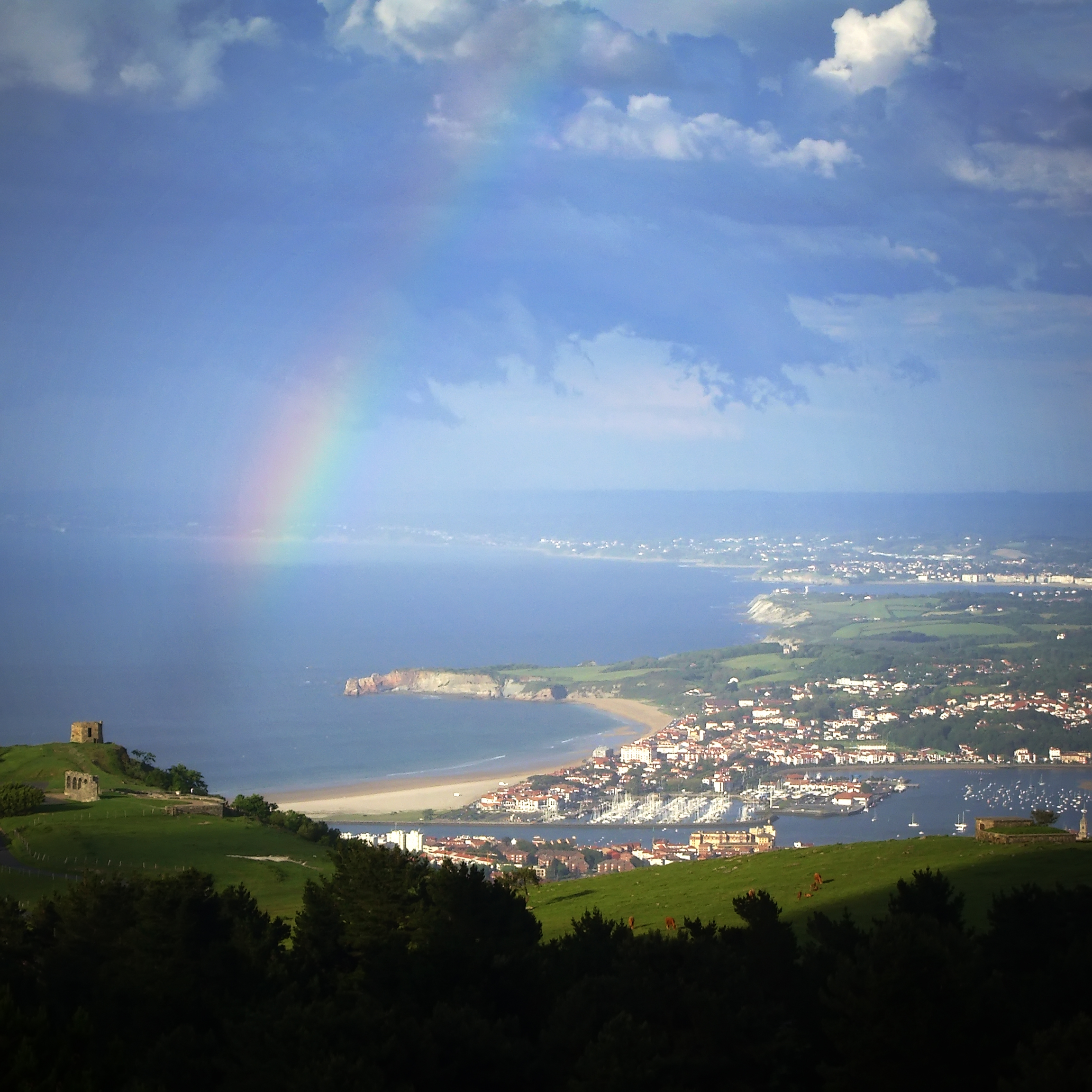
View to the east from Jaizkibel

The mountain can be approached by motor vehicle, on foot and mountain bike. A local road (Gi-3440) winds up from Lezo, running next along the backbone of the mountain range till it snakes down towards Hondarribia at the north-eastern end of the ridge. On the south-eastern side of the mountain a dust track cuts across the steep slope sideways.

The area, besides playing host to motor vehicle visitors, especially on Sunday, attracts many hikers, who find numerous paths have been signalled with GR and PR marks, with the main path (GR-121, stage of the walking Tour of Gipuzkoa) setting out in Pasaia and rising till it gets to the spine of the mountain range past the conspicuous 19th century towers. After gaining the final slopes by the booster station at the very top, the path heads north-east down green meadows, reaching a viewpoint and a small tower next. The descent continues till getting to the revered hermitage site and picnic area of Guadalupe, and on to Hondarribia. The whole stretch is 17.9 km long, some 5 hours walk. A demanding route to the top sets out from the Santo Cristo of Lezo, with the path ascending steadily across the southern side of the range roughly eastbound till it gets to the ridge and joins the GR-121 near one of the towers dotting the outline of the mountain.

The long route GR 11 cutting its way through the southern side of the Pyrenees to the Mediterranean departs from the Cape Higuer at the north-eastern tip of the mountain range, with the first kilometres running by the seashore into Hondarribia.

== Issues ==
In 2008 a controversial project is in the pipeline to build a large port outside the bay of Pasaia with a view to accommodating a bigger naval traffic and in turn encouraging the development of Pasaia's urban area within the framework of the wider scheme Jaizkibia, according to officials. The port would be located at the site of Jaizkibel's outer cliffs in an area of special natural interest in many respects. This has come up against fierce opposition of many local environmentalist groups and agencies, who try hard to prevent the scheme from being carried out.

== Cycling ==
Alto de Jaizkibel
- Location: Pais Vasco, Spain
- Start: Lezo
- Gain in altitude: 455 m (1,493 ft)
- Length of climb: 8.0 km (5.0 mi)
- Maximum elevation: 465 m (1,526 ft)
- Average gradient: 5.6 %
- Maximum gradient: 8.5 %

The Jaizikbel is often a decisive climb in the Clásica San Sebastián. Nowadays the hill is climbed twice in the race and during the last passage a small group of riders remains at the front of the race and are able to win the Clásica San Sebastián. The Jaizkibel is followed by the Alto de Arkale climb with the top only fourteen kilometers from the finish in San Sebastián.

Before the 2010 race, the Jaizkibel was climbed only once in the race, but the organisation of the race wanted a harder final because each year a larger group sprinted for the victory. To make the final more selective the organisation changed the parcours so that the Jaizkibel and Arkale needed to be climbed twice in the final.

== See also ==
- Linea P (Spain)
