= Oiartzun =

- Municipality
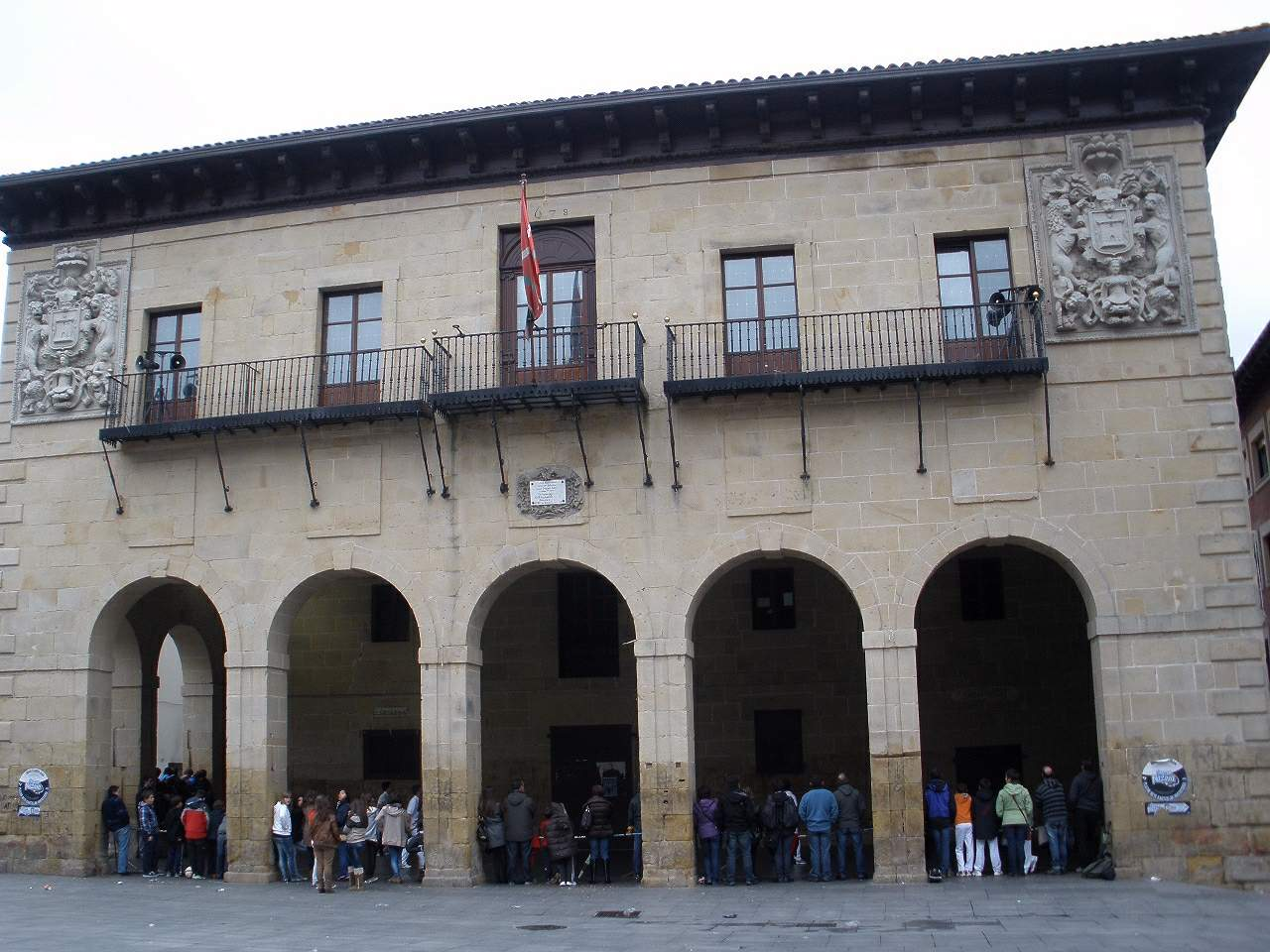
- Town hall

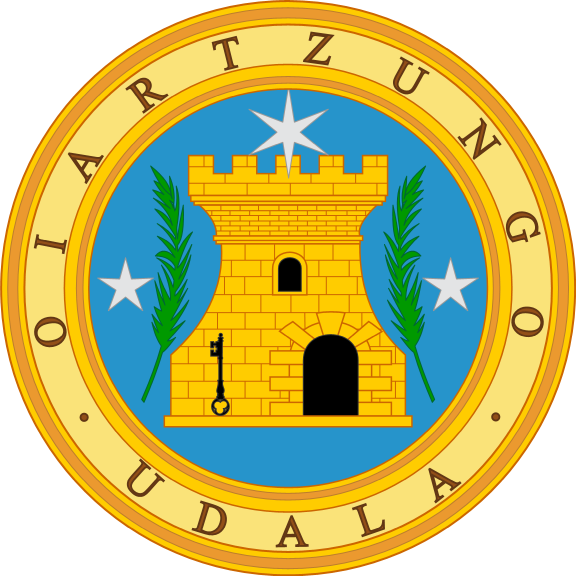
- Coat of arms

- Location of Oiartzun within the Basque Autonomous Community
- Coordinates: 43°17′55″N 1°51′40″W
- Country: Spain
- Autonomous community: Basque Country
- Province: Gipuzkoa
- Eskualdea: Oarsoaldea
- Founded: 1453

Government
  - Mayor: Joana Mendiburu Garaiar (EH Bildu)

Area
  - Total: 59.71 km^{2} (23.05 sq mi)

Population (2025-01-01)
  - Total: 10,480
  - Density: 175.5/km^{2} (454.6/sq mi)
- Demonym(s): Basque: oiartzuar Spanish: oyarsonense
- Time zone: UTC+1 (CET)
  - Summer (DST): UTC+2 (CEST)
- Postal code: 20180
- Website: Official website

Oiartzun (Basque: Oiartzun, Spanish: Oyarzun) is a town and municipality located in the Basque Country, in the province of Gipuzkoa lying at the foot of the massif Aiako Harria (Peñas de Aya in Spanish).

== Etymology ==
The name traces back to Oiasso or Oiarso, a Roman town closely connected to the Arditurri mines in the massif of Aiako Harria, which contained large amounts of silver and copper. However, it has been pinpointed to the current border town of Irun, so the name may have referred to the whole area.

== Geography ==
A river bearing the same name meanders through the meadows and neighbourhoods of this sparse municipality. That is one of its main features, it is scattered in different quarters across the valley. Elizalde lies on a prominence and it is the central nucleus of the town, with the main church San Esteban and town hall being located there. At the foot of Elizalde lies Altzibar by the Oiartzun River. Ugaldetxo developed into an urban built-up area surrounded by industrial estates near the AP-8 motorway, while the rest of the neighbourhoods have hung onto their rural and picturesque landscape to a large extent.

Alfonso VIII of Castile chartered it as town but it took some decades before its independence from Orereta was total.

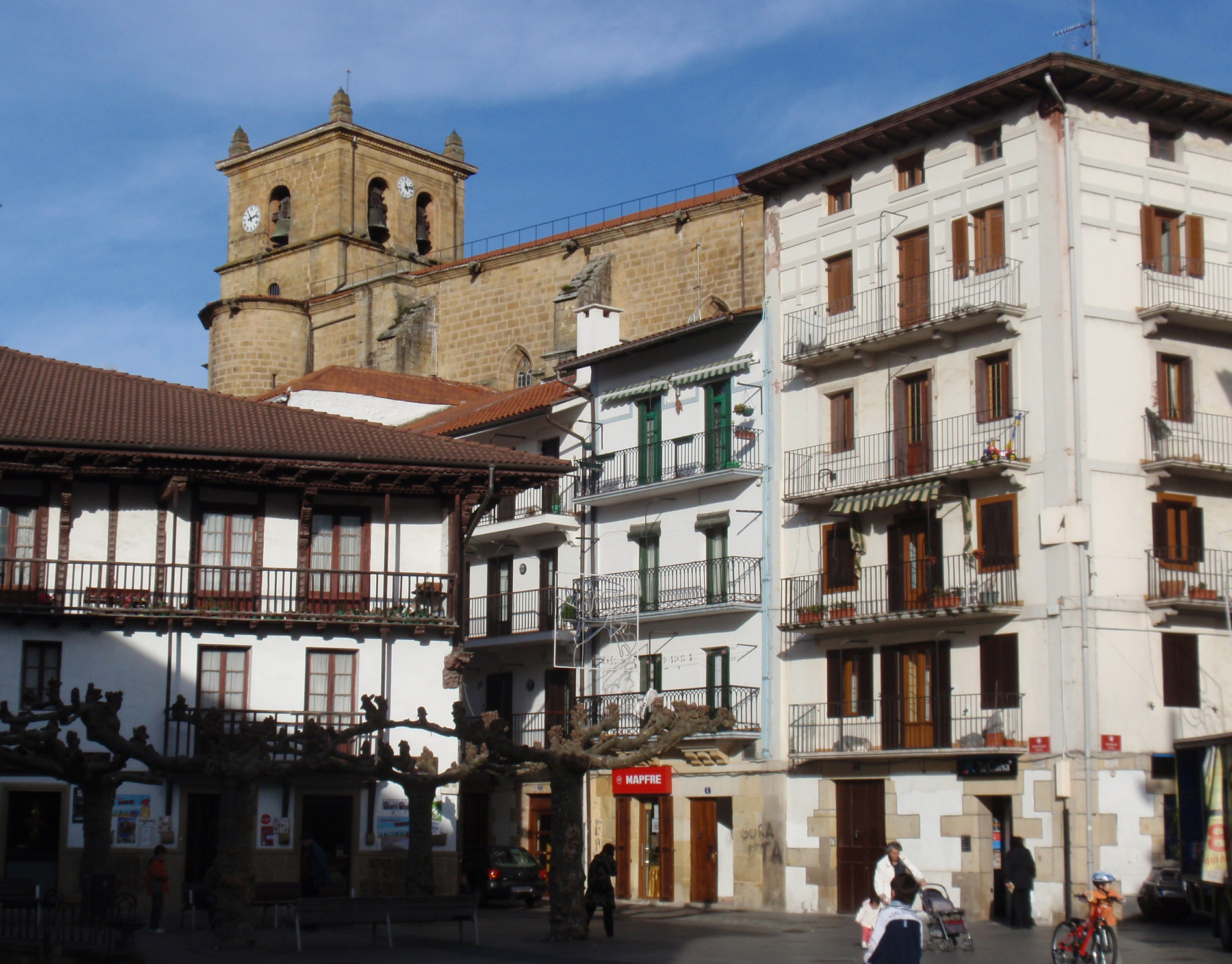
Partial view of the church of San Esteban

== Sports ==
The town's football club, Oiartzun KE, plays at Karla Lekuona. The women's side has competed in the highest division of Spanish football, making Oiartzun one of the smallest towns in the country home to a top-flight club.

== Notable people born in Oiartzun ==
- Sebastián Lartaún, Roman Catholic prelate who served as Bishop of Cuzco from 1570 to 1583
- Xabier Lete (1944–2010), writer, poet, singer and politician
- Izaskun Zubizarreta Guerendiain, (1970–2024), ski mountaineer
- Juan María Lekuona (1927–2005), priest, poet and linguist
- Rafael Picavea y Leguía (1867–1946), industrialist, politician and journalist
- José Manuel Lasa (born 1940), cyclist
- Txomin Perurena (born 1943), cyclist
- Maixux Rekalde (1934–2022), pacifist, activist, journalist
- Miguel María Lasa (born 1948), cyclist
- Iker Leonet (born 1983), cyclist

== Twin towns ==
Oiartzun is twinned with:

- Carhaix, Brittany in France
